= Scottish Animal Welfare Commission =

Scottish independent advisory body

The Scottish Animal Welfare Commission (SAWC) is the independent advisory body established by the Scottish Parliament with a focus on protection for wild and companion animals and the provision of advice to government including the scientific and ethical aspects.

== Members ==
Professor Cathy Dwyer was announced as the first Chair in September 2019, with a background of being a professor of animal behaviour and welfare at Scotland’s Rural College. In February 2020, details were announced of the other eleven members appointed by Scottish Ministers, drawn from a range of different disciplines and covering multiple areas of expertise.

== Role and establishment ==
The Commission was established by The Scottish Animal Welfare Commission Regulations 2020, made under section 36 of the 2006 Act to provide advice to Scottish Ministers and others on the welfare of protected animals, which are defined in section 17(1)(b) as being "under the control of man on a permanent or temporary basis". The Commission also has the function of providing advice on the protection of wildlife under section 23 of the Wildlife and Countryside Act 1981 was assigned by Ministerial declaration.

== Advice provided ==
The Commission publishes its workplans. The commission provided guidance on the welfare of exotic pets in Scotland, when a report was drawn up and published in 2022 following a call for evidence.

In June 2022 the Commission gave evidence around greyhound racing and did not support the continuation of unlicensed operations.

In May 2025, a report by the Commission on the potential policy implications of ascribing sentience to fish was published.
