= Scotland's Rural College =

Public land based research institution in Scotland, United Kingdom

- Scottish Gaelic: Colaiste Dhùthchail na h-Alba
- Motto: Anchored locally, impacting globally
- Type: Public land based research institution
- Established: 1899; 127 years ago (Note: As the West of Scotland Agricultural College; Barony, Oatridge, Elmwood colleges were merged with the Scottish Agricultural College in 2012.)
- Affiliations: University of Edinburgh; University of Glasgow
- Principal: Wayne Powell
- Students: 1,570 (2019/20)
- Undergraduates: 1,485 (2019/20)
- Postgraduates: 85 (2019/20)
- Location: Scotland, United Kingdom
- Campus: Aberdeen; Ayr; Barony (Note: Located in Dumfries and Galloway.); Elmwood (Note: Located in Cupar, Fife.); King's Buildings (Note: Located in Edinburgh.); Oatridge (Note: Located in West Lothian.)
- Website: www.sruc.ac.uk

Scotland's Rural College (SRUC; Scottish Gaelic: Colaiste Dhùthchail na h-Alba) is a public land based research institution focused on agriculture and life sciences. Its history stretches back to 1899 with the establishment of the West of Scotland Agricultural College and its current organisation came into being through a merger of smaller institutions.

After the West of Scotland Agricultural College was established in 1899, the Edinburgh and East of Scotland College of Agriculture and the Aberdeen and North of Scotland College of Agriculture were both established in the early 20th century. These three colleges were merged into a single institution, the Scottish Agricultural College, in 1990. In October 2012, the Scottish Agricultural College was merged with Barony College, Elmwood College and Oatridge College to re-organise the institution as Scotland's Rural College, initialised as SRUC in preparation for it gaining the status of a university college with degree awarding powers.

SRUC has six campuses across Scotland – Aberdeen, Ayr, Barony, Elmwood, King's Buildings and Oatridge. Students study land based courses from further education to postgraduate level and degrees are currently awarded by the University of Edinburgh or the University of Glasgow depending on the course of study. Undergraduates study over a period of three terms each year during their first two years and two semesters during their third and fourth years. In addition to higher education, SRUC has a consulting division, SAC Consulting, which works with clients in agricultural businesses and associated rural industries and it also has a research division which carries out research in agriculture and life sciences.

SRUC has attracted notable botanists, chemists and agriculturists as lecturers and researchers and the institution has counted Henry Dyer, Victor Hope and Maitland Mackie amongst its academic staff. In addition to careers in agriculture and life sciences, the institution's alumni have gone on to have careers in politics, sport, the military and broadcasting.

== History ==
=== Scottish Agricultural College ===
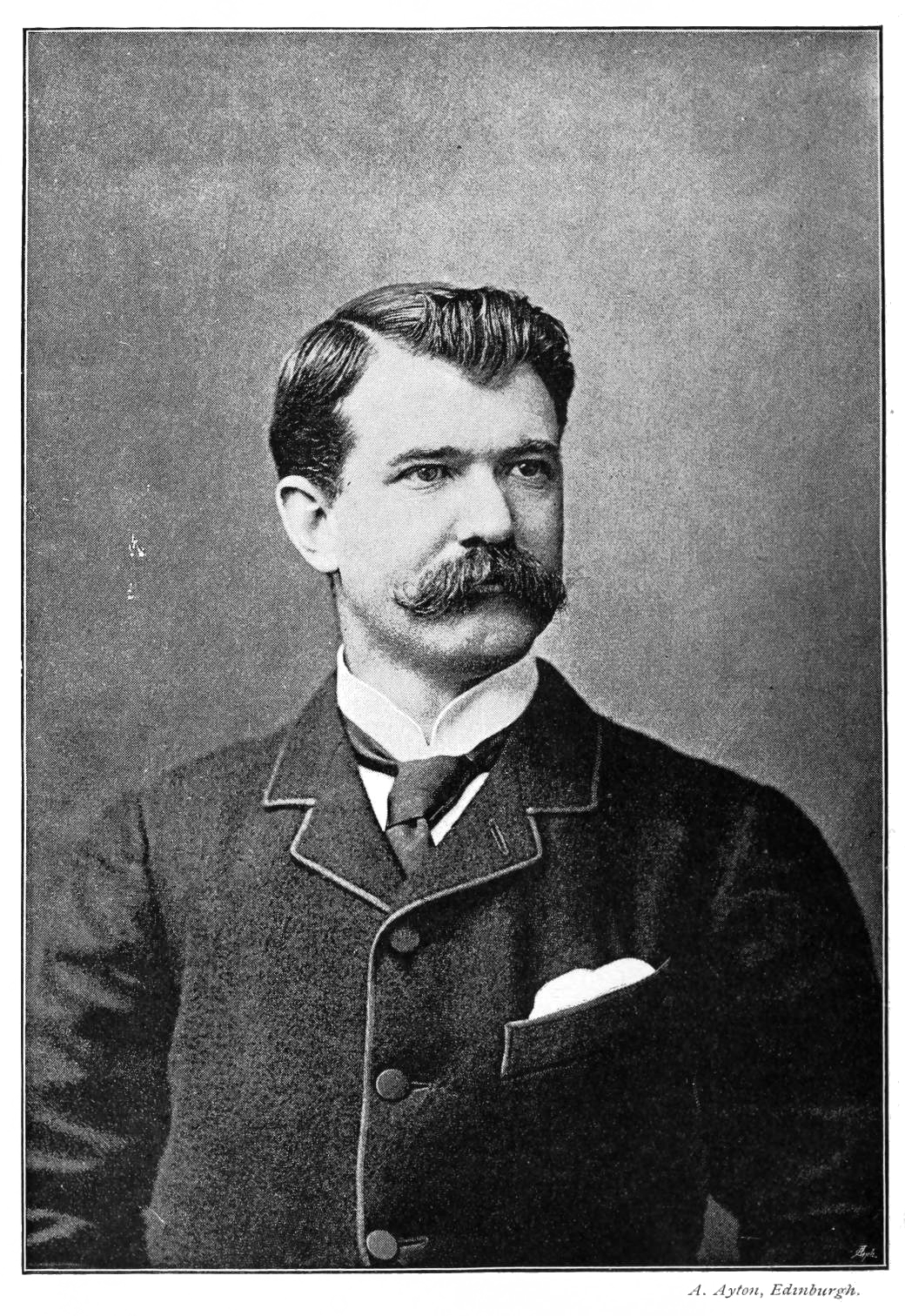
Robert Wallace, who helped found the Edinburgh and East of Scotland College of Agriculture

In 1899, Glasgow and West of Scotland Technical College's agriculture department amalgamated with the Scottish Dairy Institute to form the West of Scotland Agricultural College. Originally based in Blythswood Square, Glasgow, the institution began moving to Ayrshire when in 1927 the Auchincruive estate in the parish of St Quivox near Ayr was left to the college by the late John Hannah of Girvan Mains. In 1974, the Blythswood Square site was closed.

The Edinburgh and East of Scotland College of Agriculture was formed in 1901 and carried out experimental work in agriculture and animal breeding in south-east Scotland. Academic Robert Wallace helped found the college, having set up the bachelor's degree programme in agriculture during his time as a professor at the University of Edinburgh. Its main premises were in George Square, Edinburgh, and these were expanded in 1904 to a design by Thomas Purves Marwick architects. The college also had experimental grounds at Pinkie Hill Farm, Inveresk. In 1913, the college and the University of Edinburgh formed the joint committee on research in animal breeding which would research genetics.

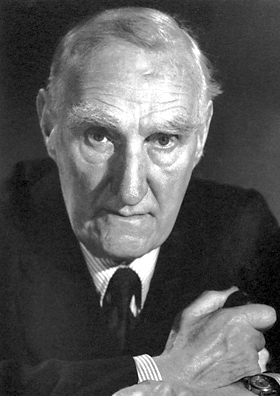
John Boyd Orr, who ran the Aberdeen joint committee for research into animal nutrition

The Aberdeen and North of Scotland College of Agriculture began in 1904 through grants from benefactors including the University of Aberdeen. Initially classes were delivered at Marischal College and these were then delivered at 581 King Street after 1969. Classes were then moved to a new teaching campus at the Craibstone Estate established in 1999, a site which the college had purchased in 1914 for research and fieldwork. Nutritional physiologist John Boyd Orr, later a president of the National Peace Council and winner of the 1949 Nobel Peace Prize, ran the institution's joint committee for research into animal nutrition with the University of Aberdeen.

As technical colleges to transfer the growing scientific knowledge of agricultural issues to farmers and the general public, the three Scottish agricultural colleges were among ten central institutions noted in 1906 as providing technical instruction and sound scientific instruction meeting the "continuation class code" set of regulations drawn up in 1901.

The company Scottish Agricultural Colleges was established in 1987 to provide direct management of advisory and veterinary functions of the regional colleges. In 1990, the West of Scotland Agricultural College was merged with the East of Scotland College of Agriculture and the North of Scotland College of Agriculture into the Scottish Agricultural College, a single higher education and research institution specialising in agriculture. The institution's three main divisions offered research, education and consultancy. The new specialist institution was one of the largest of its type in Europe and the largest in the UK. The institution offered undergraduate and postgraduate programmes from its three campuses in Ayr, Aberdeen and Edinburgh, as well as training and online study on topics including the environment, business, leisure, agriculture, horticulture and science.

=== Barony College ===
Before it became a college, the 300 acre Barony estate had a varied existence. It was an elegant home, a home for the elderly, a wartime army training camp and, up until 1947, a prisoner of war camp. In 1949 Dumfries County Council education department purchased the estate with the purpose of turning it into an agricultural school. The Barony Farm School opened in 1953, with a class of 46 boys aged 14 to 15 years. Day release classes in agriculture and engineering began in 1962.

In 1972, the school became Barony Agricultural College and, over the 1970s, courses on offer expanded to include NC awards in agriculture, fish farming, forestry, countryside rangers, horticulture, animal care, veterinary nursing and equine studies. By this time, most students at the college were studying full time. A new teaching block, complete with a large sports hall, multigym and bar, was opened in 1992. The new millennium brought extra investment in animal care and veterinary nursing, an equine unit and a forestry technology centre. The dairy technology centre with a robotic milking system was opened in 2006.

=== Oatridge College ===
Oatridge Agricultural College was established as a residential further education college specialising in agriculture and rural skills training in Ecclesmachan, West Lothian in 1969, with an initial intake of 45 residential students and 100 day students. The college was local-authority owned by West Lothian District Council, having been established by a consortium of the district councils of West Lothian, Midlothian, East Lothian, Peebles, Roxburghshire, Selkirkshire and Berwickshire.

The courses were initially taught in temporary accommodation on the farm site. New college buildings, workshops and accommodation were officially opened by Prince Philip, Duke of Edinburgh in 1974, and provided facilities for courses in agriculture, agricultural engineering, green keeping, horse care and forestry.

=== Elmwood College ===
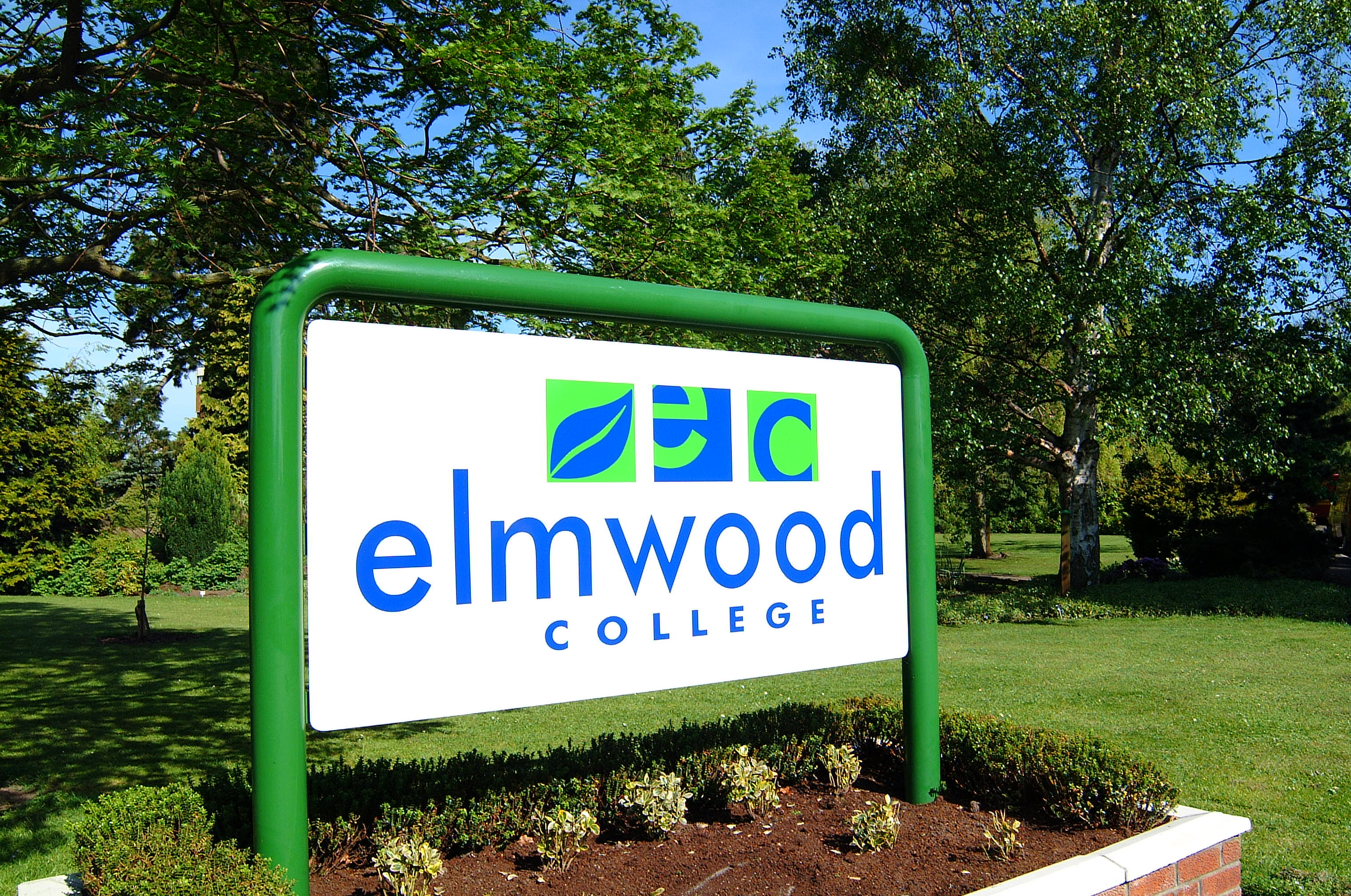
Former logo of Elmwood College

Elmwood College was founded as Elmwood Agricultural and Technical College in 1972 as a rural further education institution based in Cupar, Fife. Its foundations were laid 20 years earlier when holding classes in the local school and cricket club before the education committee of Fife County Council acquired some land and erected a Nissen hut. This was followed by the purchase of Elmwood House, Gardens and Greenhouses in 1953 for £2,300. In 1956, the first day release classes in Scotland for agricultural and horticultural apprentices commenced at Elmwood Agricultural Centre. Elmwood College continued expanding during the 1960s and a new building was completed in 1972. By then Elmwood had also acquired Stratheden Hospital Farm.

Elmwood College was officially opened in 1972 by Hector Monro. The Scottish Technical Education Consultative Council had made recommendations in 1967 around establishing regional farm centres. The college had started classes about twenty years earlier, with student numbers rising from 100 to around 2000 by 1972. There were full-time as well as part-time courses, work based courses, and modern apprenticeships. Before the purpose-built building opened in 1972, classes had been held on borrowed premises over a few years. A 350-acre farm was attached to the college and it offered courses such as hill-farming and shepherding.

A college with a part-focus on golf education, Elmwood opened its own 18-hole working golf course in 1997. Construction of a golf course began in 1995 with attention given to both the quality of the course and consideration of the local environment; the course was Geo Certified in 2013.

=== SRUC ===
A proposal to merge the Scottish Agricultural College with Barony College, Elmwood College and Oatridge College was put to public consultation between March and May 2012. Education Secretary Mike Russell voiced support for the merger in June 2012, and Scotland's Rural College formally came into existence on 1 October 2012. The work of the Scottish Agricultural College in education and training, research and development and consultancy services, would be continued by the newly-merged institution. Scotland's Rural College was given the initialism SRUC upon its founding, as it would be working towards gaining the status of a university college with degree awarding powers. Professor Wayne Powell was appointed to serve as principal of SRUC in April 2016.

In 2022, SRUC's application for degree awarding powers was approved to advance to the scrutiny stage by the Quality Assurance Agency for Higher Education advisory committee. This involves a minimum of 12 months of scrutiny, with the result of the application expected no earlier than summer 2023.

== Campuses ==
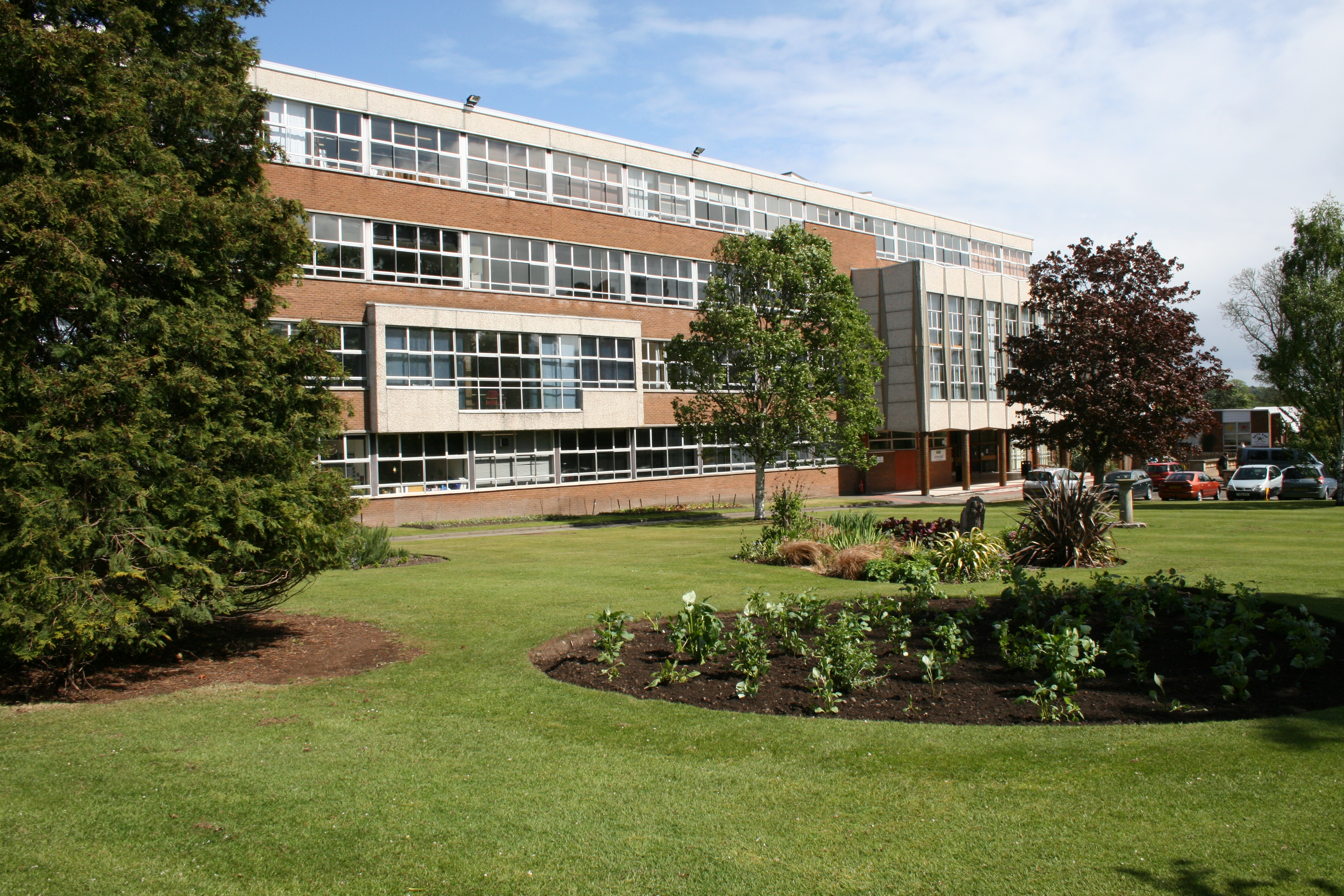
SRUC's Elmwood campus in Cupar, Fife

SRUC has six education campuses located throughout Scotland, each offering varied land-based education courses.

The Aberdeen campus is based on Craibstone Estate about 5 miles (8.0 km) outside Aberdeen in the north east of Scotland. As well as halls of residence and a library, the campus also boasts many sporting opportunities. Courses on offer in Aberdeen include agriculture, organic farming and countryside and environmental management.

The Ayr campus is shared with students from the University of the West of Scotland. The £81 million facility was opened in September 2011 and was awarded the internationally recognised BREEAM excellence rating for its environmentally friendly design. As well as student accommodation, the campus has library, sporting activities and opportunities for climbing and horse riding. Courses on offer in Ayr include Agricultural Bioscience and Green Technology.

Barony campus is set in a working 260 hectares (2.6 km^{2}) estate in Dumfries and Galloway in south west Scotland. As well as the usual student facilities such as library and accommodation, the campus is home to the Scottish dairy technology centre and the Scottish Forestry Technology Centre. Courses on offer at Barony include animal care and forestry and arboriculture.

The King's Buildings campus is located on the south side of Edinburgh. This location allows students to access the University of Edinburgh's academic and recreational facilities, with which it shares the campus. As well as libraries and cafes, the campus also has sporting amenities and bus links to the city centre. Courses on offer in Edinburgh include horticulture, applied animal science and rural resource management. The SRUC also has research facilities at the Easter Bush estate. Students studying horticulture with plantsmanship at the King's Buildings campus also study at the Royal Botanic Garden Edinburgh.

SRUC's Elmwood campus is based in Cupar, a small town in Fife approximately nine miles from St Andrews. There are three parts to Elmwood campus. The main campus is on Carslogie Road, Cupar. The second campus is at Stratheden, which is where the college's golf course is based. Cuparmuir Farm is the third campus, where most of the land-based courses are taught. As well having as a golf course, students can use badminton, table tennis, football and gym facilities. It continues teaching land based courses including conservation, greenkeeping and gamekeeping.

Situated in West Lothian, SRUC's Oatridge campus is set on a large estate which includes a working farm. As well as a student accommodation and a library, there is also a nine-hole golf course, and the campus is home to the Scottish National Equestrian Centre (SNEC). Courses on offer at Oatridge include farriery and forge work, and land-based engineering.

== Institutional profile ==
Rankings
Global rankings
- THE (2026): 601–800

As a public institution, SRUC is registered as a charity under Scottish law. The further education and undergraduate degree programmes at SRUC are grouped into six main departments: Agriculture and Business Management, Animal and Equine, Engineering, Science and Technology, Environment and Countryside, Horticulture and Landscape, and Sport and Tourism. Students can study taught courses which range from vocational and access level through undergraduate level, covering Higher National Certificate, Higher National Diploma and bachelor's degree courses, to postgraduate level, covering master's degree and PhD courses. Degrees are awarded by the University of Edinburgh and the University of Glasgow. Undergraduate students study over a period of three terms each year during their first two years and a period of two semesters during their third and fourth years.

The institution's consulting division, SAC Consulting, works with more than 12,000 clients in rural businesses and associated industries. The consulting arm has 24 offices located across Scotland and in the north of England, as well as eight veterinary surveillance centres. SRUC's research division operates in six research centres, and SRUC also runs eight farms for both research and educational purposes. SRUC's research division is divided into four interdisciplinary research groups, each devoted to its own focus of land-based research: Animal Health and Veterinary Science Group, Crop and Soil Systems Research Group, Future Farming Systems Research Group, and Land Economy, Environment and Society Research Group.

== Notable alumni and academic staff ==
The institution has educated politicians Alex Fergusson, John Home Robertson, Ian Liddell-Grainger, Róisín McLaren, Hugh Roberton, Douglas Ross, Mark Ruskell, Struan Stevenson and Andy Stewart; sportspeople Ian Barr, Thomas Muirhead, Jo Pitt and Doddie Weir; military officers John Gilmour and William Reid VC; and broadcaster and author Frances Tophill.

Gallery of notable alumni

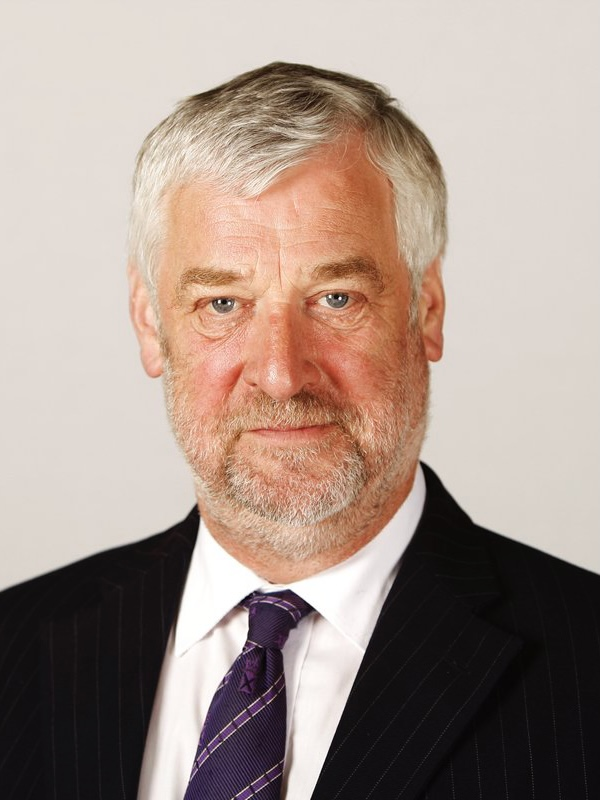
Alex Fergusson, Presiding Officer of the Scottish Parliament

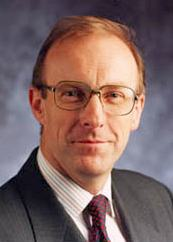
John Home Robertson, Member of the Scottish Parliament for East Lothian

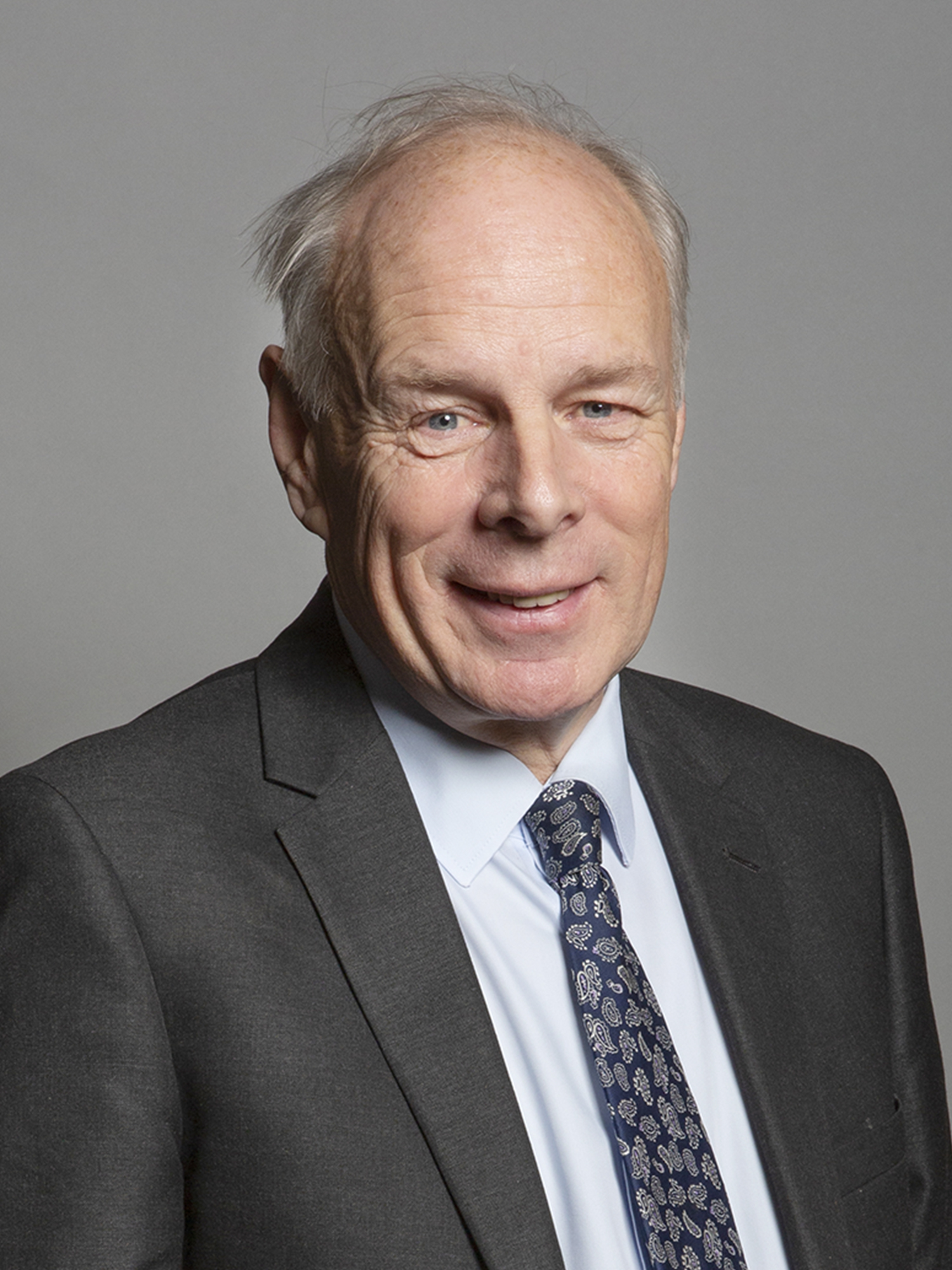
Ian Liddell-Grainger, Member of Parliament for Bridgwater and West Somerset

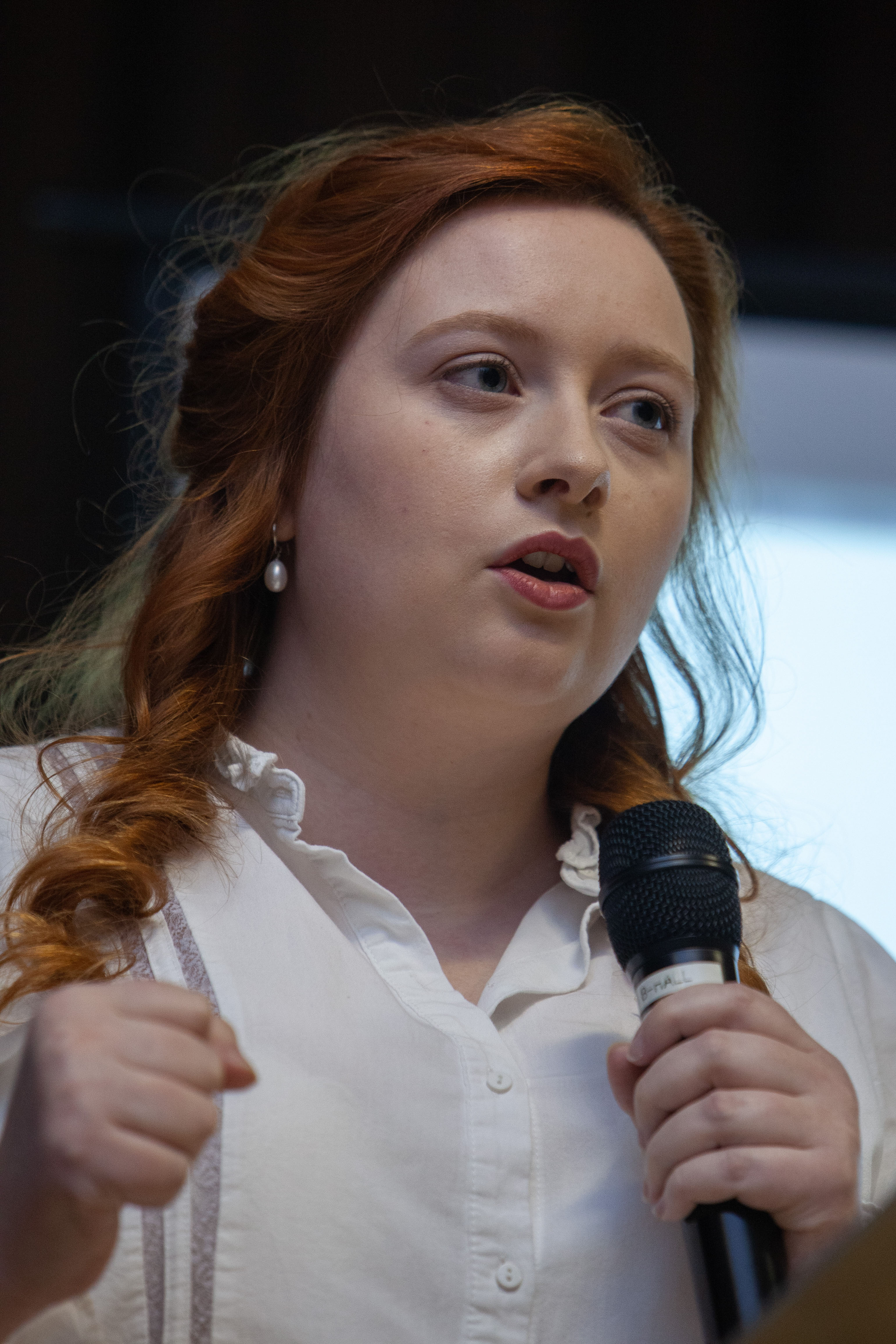
Roisin McLaren, Scottish Socialist Party spokesperson

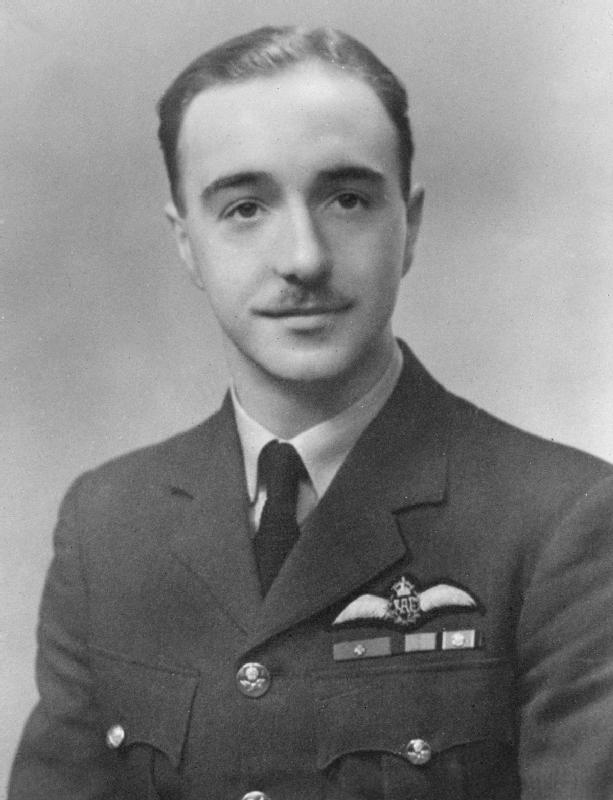
William Reid, recipient of the Victoria Cross

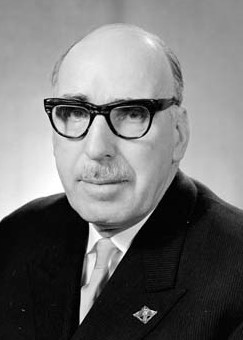
Hugh Roberton, Australian Minister for Social Services

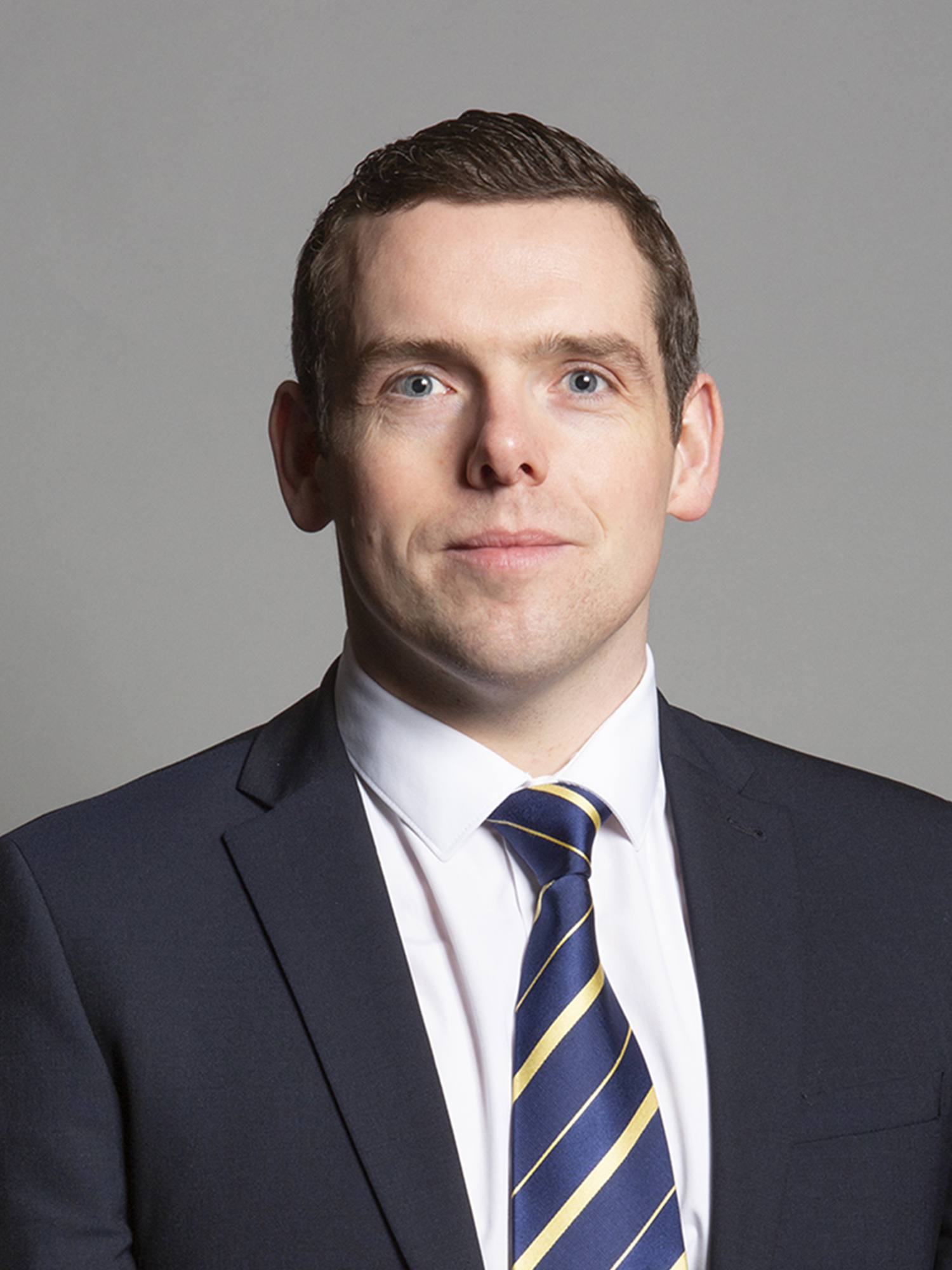
Douglas Ross, Leader of the Scottish Conservative Party

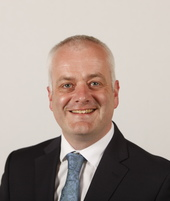
Mark Ruskell, Member of the Scottish Parliament for Mid Scotland and Fife

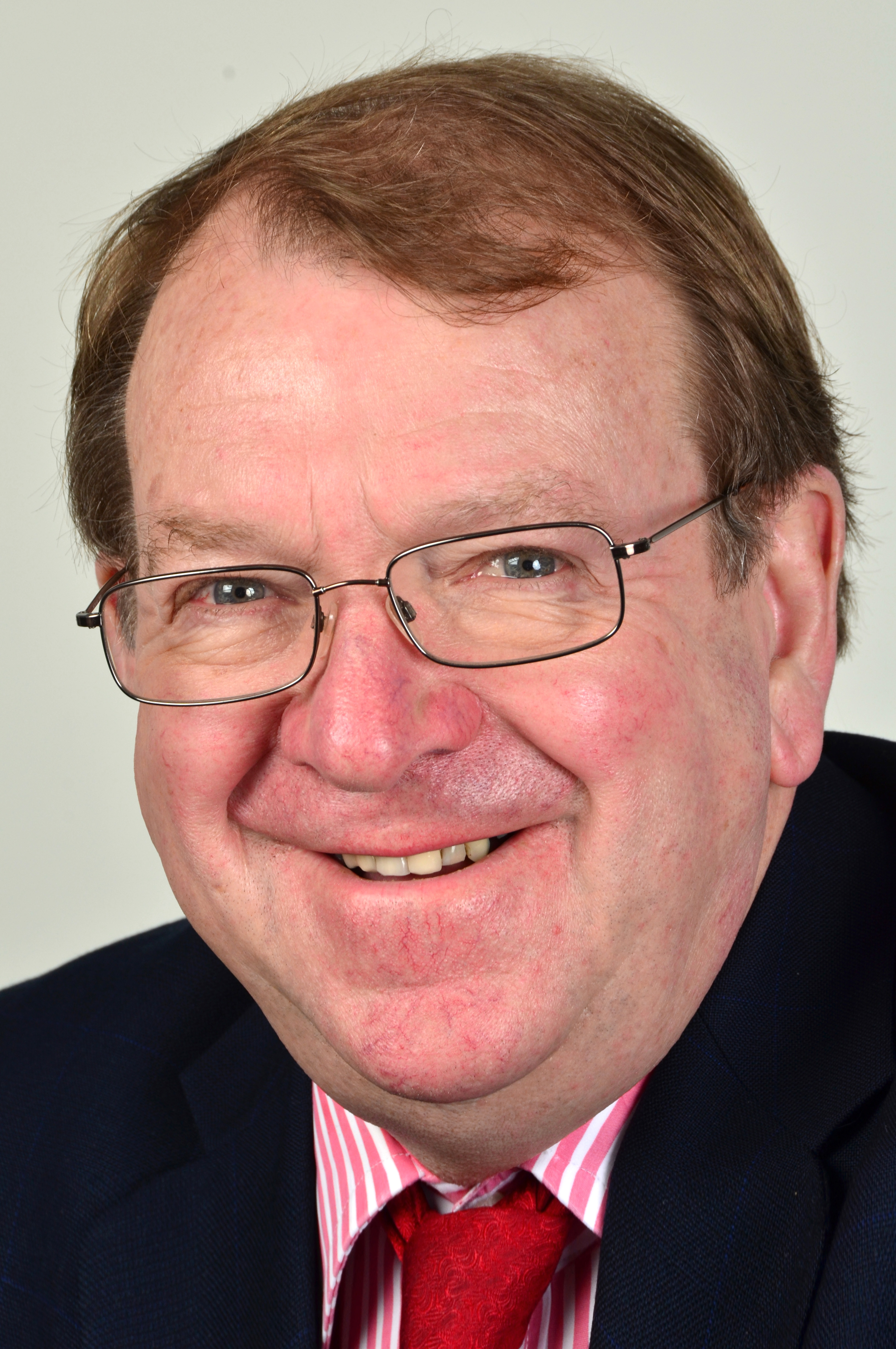
Struan Stevenson, Member of the European Parliament for Scotland
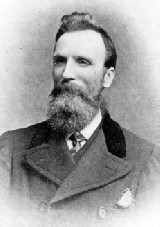
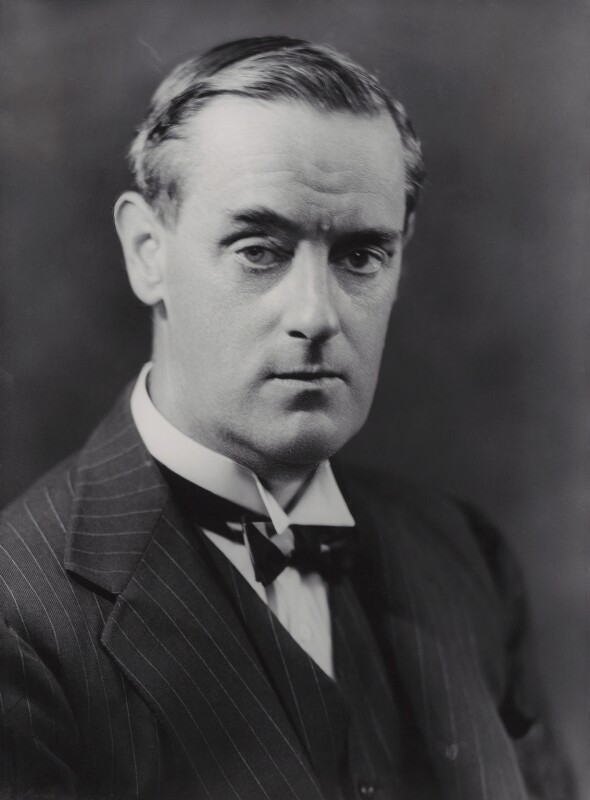
Henry Dyer served as governor of the institution and Victor Hope served as its president.

Governors of the institution have included pioneering technical educator Henry Dyer and agriculturist and Liberal Party politician Maitland Mackie. Agriculturist Victor Hope, later Governor-General of India, served as a president of the institution in the early 1930s. Chemist William Gammie Ogg, later director of the Rothamsted Experimental Station, worked as an advisory officer. Government agricultural adviser Arthur Wannop was a director of county work. Academics Ernest Shearer and Stephen John Watson successively served as principal in addition to their role as professor of agriculture at the University of Edinburgh. Margaret Farquhar, later Lord Provost of Aberdeen, had been a clerk at the institution before entering local government.

Botanists who have worked at the institution have included Green Party politician Martin Ford, Noel Farnie Robertson (who ran the partnership between the institution and the University of Edinburgh), William Gardner Smith and Edward Wyllie Fenton. Alexander Lauder and Hugh Nicol were both chemists who lectured there. Mycologist and plant pathologist R. W. G. Dennis researched oat pathology at the institution. Allen Kerr, a professor of plant pathology at University of Adelaide known for his study of crown gall, worked as an assistant mycologist and Alan Gemmell, the first professor of biology at Keele University, as an agricultural researcher. Veterinary surgeon William Christopher Miller lectured in animal hygiene and decorated Scout leader Alec Spalding MBE was an agricultural economist at the institution. Entomologist Daniel MacLagan served as head of the zoology department and William Whigham Fletcher as head of botany in Glasgow. Academic Alison Bailey worked at the institution before moving to New Zealand to become professor of farm management at Lincoln University.

== See also ==
- List of agricultural universities and colleges
