= Martin Ford (politician) =

Scottish politician and botanist

Martin A. Ford is a Scottish politician, who is the Scottish Green Party councillor for the East Garioch ward of Aberdeenshire Council. He had a prominent role in the consideration of a planning application for a golf course at Balmedie.

== Education and early life ==
Ford trained as a botanist, completing a doctorate University of Wales (at University College Swansea) in 1986; 'Pollinator-mediated interactions between out-breeding annual weeds'. In 1988 he moved to Aberdeenshire to work at the North of Scotland College of Agriculture.

== Political career ==
He stood as a candidate in the 1992 United Kingdom general election for the Aberdeen North to raise environmental issues.

In the 1999 Scottish local elections, he was first elected to Aberdeenshire Council as a Lib Dem councillor. He was elected again in 2003 and 2007.

In 2006, Donald Trump bought the Menie estate in Balmedie, Aberdeenshire, Scotland, and Ford found himself chair of the committee that would determine the planning application to create a highly contentious golf resort against the wishes of local residents on an area designated as a site of special scientific interest. In November 2006, Ford had the casting vote, which led to the committee rejecting plans for the Menie resort, however, the Scottish Government stepped in and the development proceeded. Ford spoke to BBC's Panorama television programme about the development, following this he received several letters from the council's chief executive.

In December 2007, he was unseated from the position of committee chair of Aberdeenshire Council's infrastructure services.

In May 2008, he was reported to be considering standing as a candidate for the UK Parliament Aberdeen South seat. He stood for Rector of the University of Aberdeen in 2008, but was beaten by Stephen Robertson.

He resigned from the Lib-dems in January 2009, after having been a member of the party for twenty years. Six months later he joined the Greens, who two years previously had made a public invitation for him to join them.

In 2011, Ford's account of the Trump affair Deciding the Fate of a Magical Wild Place was published in the Journal of Irish and Scottish Studies.

In May 2015, it was announced that Ford, as part of the Democratic Independent and Green Group (DIGG), had agreed to lend support the Scottish National Party (SNP) council group on a confidence and supply basis.
