= William Reid (VC) =

Recipient of the Victoria Cross

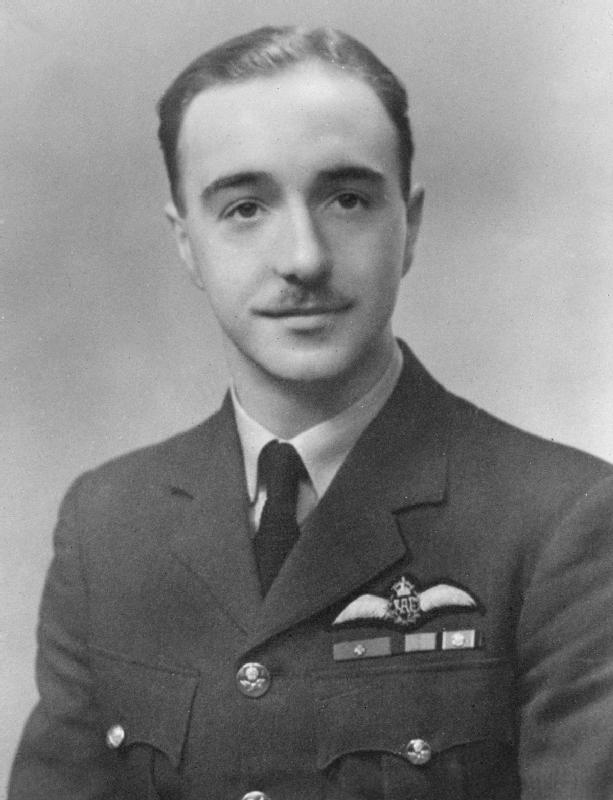
- Born: 21 December 1921; Baillieston, Glasgow
- Died: 28 November 2001 (aged 79); Crieff, Perthshire
- Burial place: Crieff Cemetery
- Military career
- Allegiance: United Kingdom
- Branch: Royal Air Force
- Service years: 1940–1949
- Rank: Flight Lieutenant
- Units: No. 61 Squadron RAF; No. 617 Squadron RAF
- Conflicts: Second World War
- Awards: Victoria Cross

William Reid, VC (21 December 1921 – 28 November 2001) was a Scottish recipient of the Victoria Cross, the highest award for gallantry in the face of the enemy that can be awarded to British and Commonwealth forces. He earned his Victoria Cross as a pilot in the Royal Air Force Bomber Command during the Second World War.

Born in Baillieston, Lanarkshire, he applied to join the RAF on the outbreak of war. After initial training, he was selected as a bomber pilot, and soon became a flying instructor himself. He was eventually given an operational posting, flying several raids before that on Düsseldorf which led to the award of the VC. On a later raid he was shot down and became a prisoner of war in Germany. He left the RAF after the war, and worked in the agricultural industry.

On 19 November 2009 his VC was sold at auction for £348,000, then a record for a VC awarded to a recipient from the United Kingdom.

== Early life ==
William Reid was born in Baillieston, near Glasgow, on 21 December 1921 the son of a blacksmith. He was educated at Swinton Primary School and Coatbridge Higher Grade School and studied metallurgy for a time, but then applied to join the RAF. After training in Canada, he received his wings and was a sergeant when he was commissioned as a pilot officer on probation in the Royal Air Force Volunteer Reserve on 19 June 1942. He then trained on twin-engined Airspeed Oxfords at Little Rissington before moving to the Operational Training Unit at RAF North Luffenham. There, his skill as a pilot led to his being selected as an instructor, flying the Vickers Wellington, albeit with the promise of a posting to an Avro Lancaster heavy bomber unit. He was promoted to flying officer on 19 December 1942.

The posting did not materialise until July 1943, when he was sent to 1654 Conversion Unit, RAF Wigsley, near Newark-on-Trent, where he flew his first operational mission as second pilot, in a Lancaster of 9 Squadron, in a raid on Mönchengladbach. In September he was posted to 61 Squadron at RAF Syerston, Newark, to commence Lancaster bombing operations, and flew seven sorties to various German cities before the raid on Düsseldorf.

== Düsseldorf ==
Reid was a 21-year-old acting flight lieutenant, serving in 61 Squadron when he took part in the raid on Düsseldorf, Germany, for which he was awarded his VC.

On the night of 3 November 1943, while still underway to the target area in Düsseldorf, the windscreen of Reid's Lancaster (serial LM360) was shattered by rounds from an attacking Messerschmitt Bf 110 night fighter, badly damaging the cockpit and rear gun turret. In spite of multiple injuries Reid continued on his mission, though was again attacked shortly afterwards by a Focke-Wulf Fw 190, killing his navigator and fatally wounding the wireless operator. Reid himself was further wounded, as was the flight engineer. A section of the Lancaster's starboard tailplane had also been shot away. Reid again decided to carry on, saying later in an interview that his main reason for pressing on was that turning back would have involved flying through or across the following bomber stream, with the danger of mid-air collision.

Reaching the target, Reid released his bomb load and set course for home. Plotting a course back to Syerston, without a navigator, Reid gratefully noticed the searchlights of RAF Shipdham, a USAAF-operated base in Norfolk.

Despite his wounds and loss of blood, Reid successfully landed his plane, though its damaged undercarriage collapsed and the aircraft slid along the runway. The wireless operator died in Shipdham's medical centre but five of the crew survived.

Reid was awarded the VC on 14 December 1943, with the citation reading:

Air Ministry, 14th December, 1943.

The KING has been graciously pleased to confer the VICTORIA CROSS on the undermentioned officer in recognition of most conspicuous bravery: —

Acting Flight Lieutenant William REID (124438), Royal Air Force Volunteer Reserve, No. 61 Squadron.

On the night of November 3rd, 1943, Flight Lieutenant Reid was pilot and captain of a Lancaster aircraft detailed to attack Dusseldorf.

Shortly after crossing the Dutch coast, the pilot's windscreen was shattered by fire from a Messerschmitt 110. Owing to a failure in the heating circuit, the rear gunner's hands were too cold for him to open fire immediately or to operate his microphone and so give warning of danger; but after a brief delay he managed to return the Messerschmitt's fire and it was driven off.

During the fight with the Messerschmitt, Flight Lieutenant Reid was wounded in the head, shoulders and hands. The elevator trimming tabs of the aircraft were damaged and it became difficult to control. The rear turret, too, was badly damaged and the communications system and compasses were put out of action. Flight Lieutenant Reid ascertained that his crew were unscathed and, saying nothing about his own injuries, he continued his mission.

Soon afterwards, the Lancaster was attacked by a Focke-Wulf 190. This time, the enemy's fire raked the bomber from stem to stern. The rear gunner replied with his only serviceable gun but the state of his turret made accurate aiming impossible. The navigator was killed and the wireless operator fatally injured. The mid-upper turret was hit and the oxygen system put out of action. Flight Lieutenant Reid was again wounded and the flight engineer, though hit in the forearm, supplied him with oxygen from a portable supply.

Flight Lieutenant Reid refused to be turned from his objective and Dusseldorf was reached some 50 minutes later. He had memorised his course to the target and had continued in such a normal manner that the bomb-aimer, who was cut off by the failure of the communications system, knew nothing of his captain's injuries or of the casualties to his comrades. Photographs show that, when the bombs were released, the aircraft was right over the centre of the target.

Steering by the pole star and the moon, Flight Lieutenant Reid then set course for home. He was growing weak from loss of blood. The emergency oxygen supply had given out. With the windscreen shattered, the cold was intense. He lapsed into semiconsciousness. The flight engineer, with some help from the bomb-aimer, kept the Lancaster in the air despite heavy anti-aircraft fire over the Dutch coast.

The North Sea crossing was accomplished. An airfield was sighted. The captain revived, resumed control and made ready to land. Ground mist partially obscured the runway lights. The captain was also much bothered by blood from his head wound getting into his eyes. But he made a safe landing although one leg of the damaged undercarriage collapsed when the load came on.

Wounded in two attacks, without oxygen, suffering severely from cold, his navigator dead, his wireless operator fatally wounded, his aircraft crippled and defenceless, Flight Lieutenant Reid showed superb courage and leadership in penetrating a further 200 miles into enemy territory to attack one of the most strongly defended targets in Germany, every additional mile increasing the hazards of the long and perilous journey home. His tenacity and devotion to duty were beyond praise.

== 617 Squadron ==
After a period in hospital, Reid went to C Flight, 617 (Dambuster) Squadron at RAF Woodhall Spa in January 1944 and flew sorties to various targets in France. He was promoted to substantive flight lieutenant on 14 June 1944.

On 31 July 1944, 617 Squadron was linked with 9 Squadron for a "Tallboy" deep penetration bomb attack on a V-weapon storage dump at Rilly-la-Montagne, near Rheims. As Reid, flying in Lancaster Mk.I ME557 KC-S, released his bomb over the target at 12,000 ft, he felt his aircraft shudder under the impact of a bomb dropped by another Lancaster 6,000 ft above. The bomb ploughed through his aeroplane's fuselage, severing all control cables and fatally weakening its structure, and Reid gave the order to bail out.

As members of his crew scrambled out, the plane went into a dive, pinning Reid to his seat. Reaching overhead, he managed to release the escape hatch panel and struggled out just as the Lancaster broke in two. He landed heavily by parachute, breaking his arm in the fall. Within an hour he was captured by a German patrol and taken prisoner. After various transfers, he ended the war in Stalag III-A prisoner of war camp at Luckenwalde, west of Berlin.

== Post war ==
Reid was demobilised in 1946 and resumed his studies, first at the University of Glasgow and later at the West of Scotland Agricultural College. After graduating from the University of Glasgow in 1949, he went on a travelling scholarship for six months, studying agriculture in India, Australia, New Zealand, America and Canada. He retained a reserve commission until 15 January 1949.

== Later years ==
In 1950, he became an agricultural adviser to the MacRobert Trust, Douneside. From 1959 to his retirement in 1981, he was an adviser to a firm of animal feed manufacturers.

Reid is interviewed and provides a vivid description of the mission for which he was awarded the Victoria Cross in episode 12, "Whirlwind – Bombing Germany (September 1939 – April 1944)", of the acclaimed 1973–74 British documentary television series, The World at War.

== Personal life ==
Reid married Violet Campbell Gallagher, a daughter of William Gallagher, sports editor of the Glasgow Daily Record in 1952. She was reportedly unaware that he was a VC holder until they were married.

== Death ==
William Reid died at the age of 79 on 28 November 2001, survived by his wife and their two children. On 19 November 2009, his VC was sold at an auction by medal specialists Spink. It went to an anonymous bidder for £348,000, a record for a VC awarded to someone from the United Kingdom. The bidder was later revealed to be Melissa John, in memory of her late brother, and that she had outbid the buyers acting for Michael Ashcroft in the auction.
