= Alison Bailey (New Zealand academic) =

Professor of Farm Management

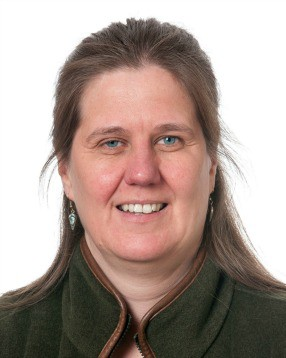
Alison Bailey

Alison Bailey is a New Zealand farm management academic researching the economics of farming.

Bailey completed both her undergraduate studies and PhD at University of Wales, Aberystwyth. After completing her PhD, she worked at Scottish Agricultural College, Edinburgh, University of Reading and Cranfield University. Appointed in 2015, she is currently professor of farm management at Lincoln University.
