= Robert Wallace (professor) =

Scottish agricultural academic (1853–1939)

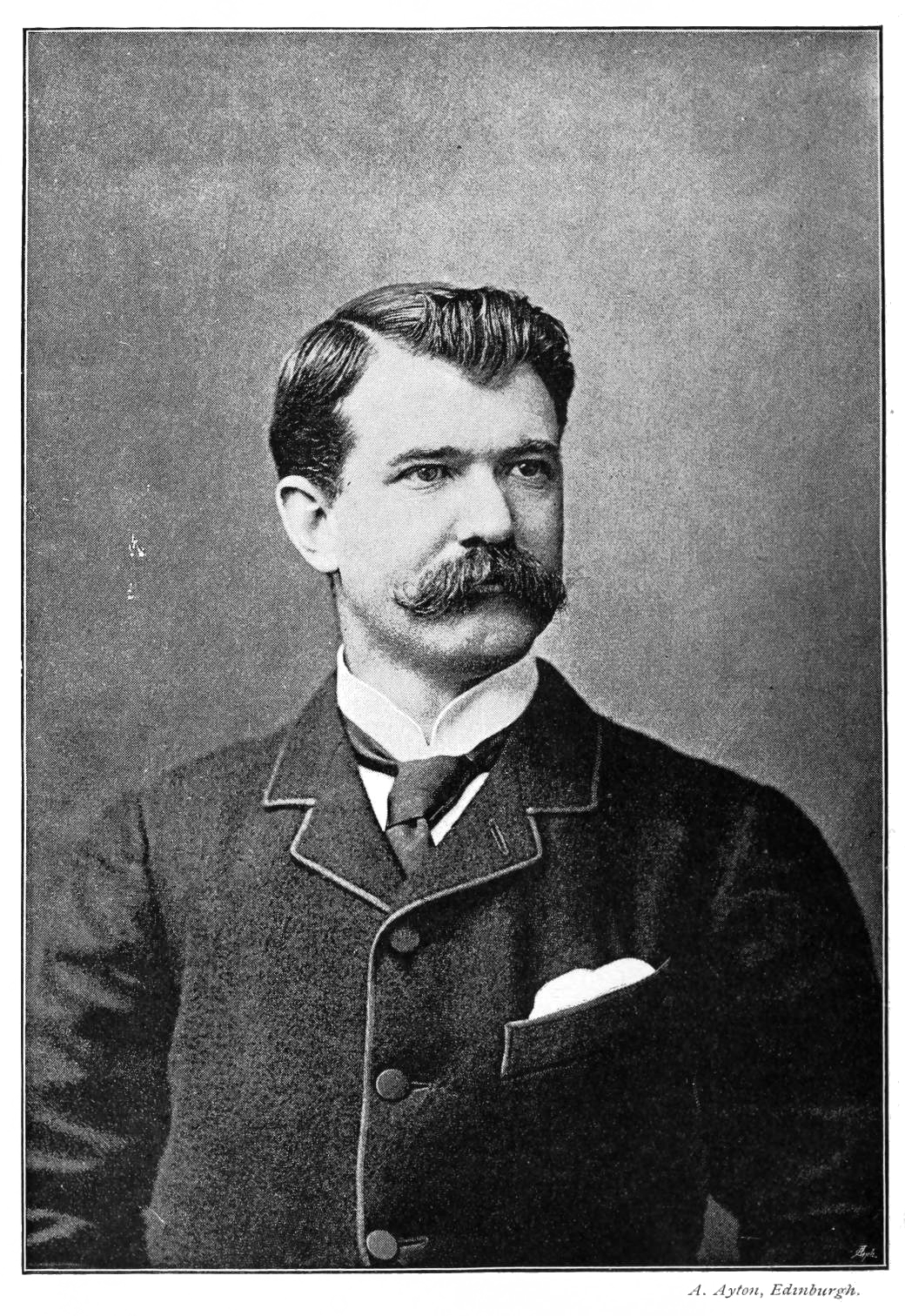
Wallace in 1891

Robert Wallace FRSE FLS FRGS (24 June 1853 – 17 January 1939) was a Scottish professor of agriculture who worked at the Royal Agricultural College, Cirencester and at the University of Edinburgh where he helped establish agricultural education. He travelled around the British colonies, examining agriculture and livestock husbandry, and wrote numerous books and contributed several entries related to farming for the 11th edition of Encyclopaedia Britannica.

== Life ==
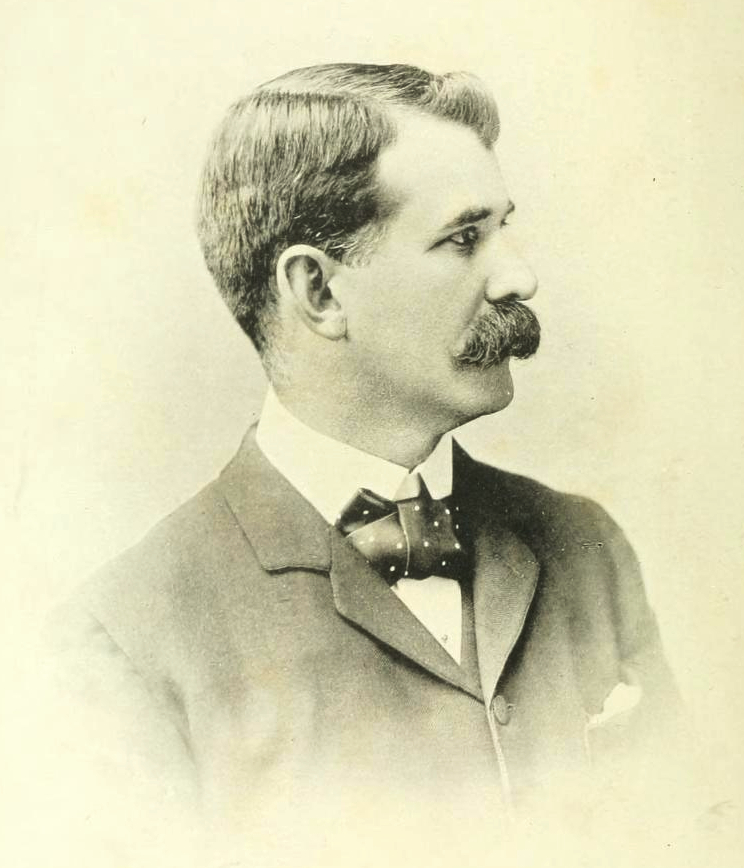
Wallace c. 1896

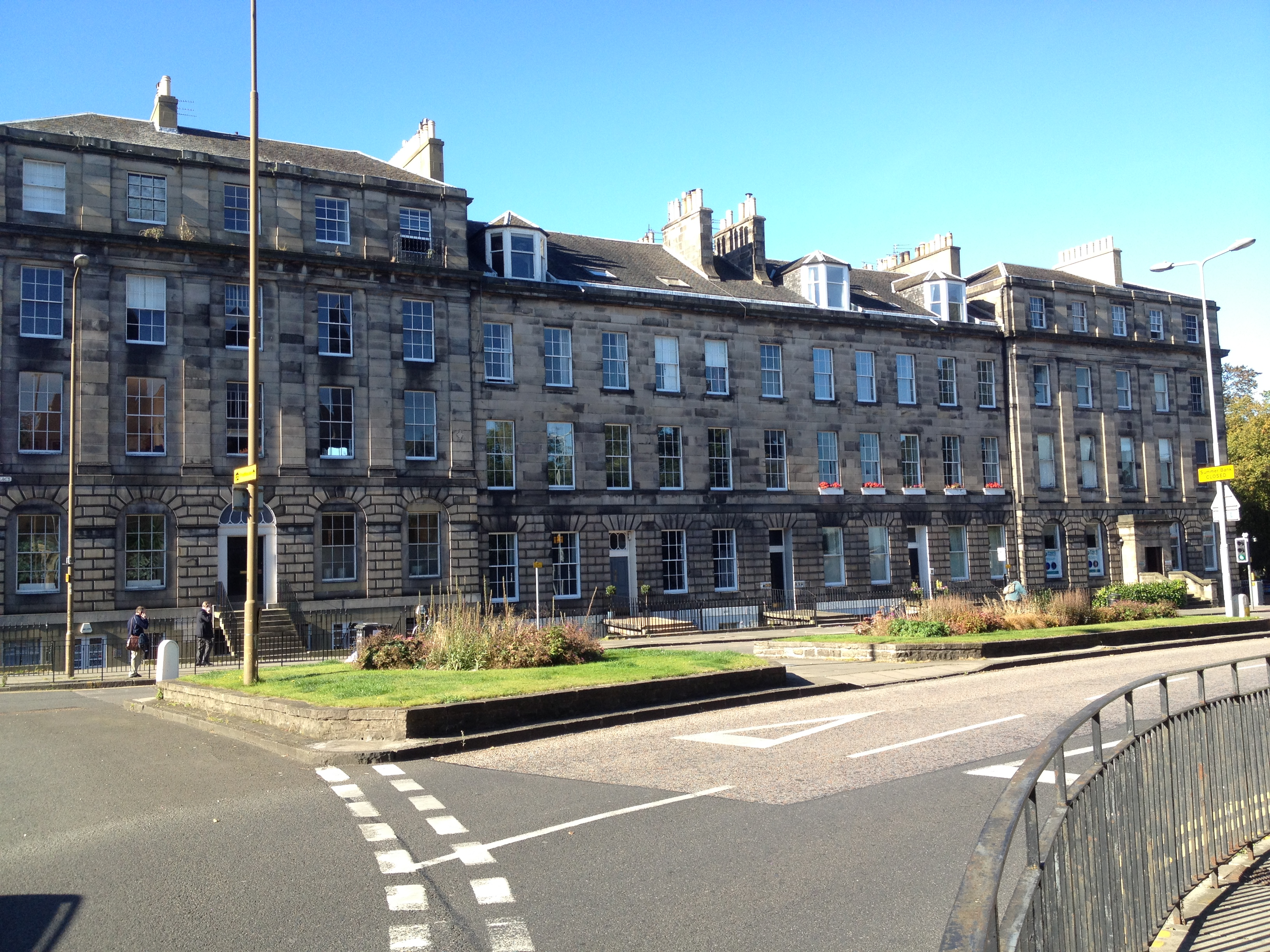
Mansfield Place in Edinburgh

Wallace was born on 24 June 1853 in the ancestral family home, Wallace Hall in Glencairn, Dumfriesshire, the second son of Susan Reid and her husband, Samuel Wallace, a gentleman farmer. He was educated at Tynron Parish School and then Hutton Hall Academy near Bankend. He then studied at the University of Edinburgh graduating with an MA around 1872. He then spent ten years farming his father's estates along with his brother Samuel Williamson Wallace (1855–1932) who became director of agriculture for the state of Victoria in Australia in 1902.

From 1882 to 1885, he began to teach at the Royal Agricultural College in Cirencester and served as a Professor of Agriculture. In 1885, he returned to Edinburgh as Professor of Agriculture and Rural Economy. In 1886, he was elected a Fellow of the Royal Society of Edinburgh proposed by Robert Gray, John Wilson, Peter Guthrie Tait and Henry Alleyne Nicholson. He worked towards the establishment of BSc degrees in agriculture and in helped found the Edinburgh and East of Scotland College of Agriculture in 1906. From 1915 to 1917, he corresponded with President Woodrow Wilson of the United States on the ill-treatment of prisoners-of-war by Germany and sought American intervention.

Wallace was Garton Lecturer on Colonial and Indian Agriculture (1900-1922) which helped spread his reputation across the colonies. Wallace travelled widely, to Italy and India in 1887, the latter resulting in a book India in 1887 in which he examined livestock farming and agriculture in India. Wallace travelled to India in an unofficial capacity, with a special interest in livestock. He took numerous photographs and several notes were published in scholarly societies. Communicating with Thomas Henry Huxley, he speculated on the skin colours of Indian cattle, commenting that they were predominantly dark skinned and suggested that they may have been selected for the same underlying but unexplained mechanism leading to darker human skin colour in the tropics. He travelled to the United States thrice between 1890 and 1898 with trips to Egypt (1891), Greece (1892) and South Africa (1895) in the same period. He corresponded extensively with Eleanor Ormerod and edited a biography of her published in 1904.

In 1900, he was living at 5 Mansfield Place in Edinburgh's New Town. From 1910 to 1923, he was living at 21 East Claremont Street.

Wallace was a Fellow of the Royal Scottish Geographical Society and the Royal Physical Society of Edinburgh. He was also a member of the Highland and Agricultural Society of Scotland. He retired in 1922 but continued to hold advisory positions and represented the Scottish Board of Agriculture in the 1923 World Dairy Congress in Washington D. C. He died at Mid Park House, Kincardine-on-Forth on 17 January 1939 aged 85.

== Publications ==
- India in 1887 (1888)
- Farm Live Stock in Great Britain (1889)
- The rural economy and agriculture of Australia and New Zealand (1891)
- Argentine Shows and Livestock (1904)
- Farming Industries of the Cape Colony (1896)
- 11th edition Encyclopaedia Britannica: entries on "Cattle", "Sheep". "Pigs" and "Horses" (1911)
- ODNB: William Fream (1912)
- ODNB: Eleanor Ormerod (1912)
- Heather and Moor Burning for Grouse and Sheep (1917)
- Letters to President Woodrow Wilson (1931)
