= Hugh Nicol (chemist) =

British bacteriologist and agricultural chemist (1898–1972)

Prof Hugh Nicol FRSE FRIC FCS (1898-1972) was a British bacteriologist and agricultural chemist.

== Life ==
He was born in Shoreham-by-Sea in Sussex on 5 July 1898.

He studied Science at the University of London. He then became an Assistant Bacteriologist at Rothamsted Experimental Station then moved to the Commonwealth Bureau of Soil Science. In 1946 he moved to Scotland as Professor of Agricultural Chemistry at the West of Scotland Agricultural College in Glasgow.

In 1952 he was elected a Fellow of the Royal Society of Edinburgh. His proposers were Sir William Gammie Ogg, Kenneth Braid, Donald McArthur and John Walton.

He retired in 1963 and died at home in Shoreham-by-Sea on 27 August 1972.

== Publications ==
- Microbes by the Million (1939 reprinted 1945)
- Microbes and Us (1955)
- The Limits of Man (1967)
