= Ernest Shearer =

Ernest Shearer FRSE (1879–14 September 1945) was a British agriculturalist and academic.

== Life ==
He was born in Stromness on Orkney into a farming family.

In 1897 he went to the University of Edinburgh graduating with an MA in Economics followed by a BSc in agriculture in 1904. His first appointment was with the Indian Agricultural Service.

In 1911 he became technical adviser to the Ministry of Agriculture in Egypt. He was also appointed Principal of the College of Agriculture in Giza. In 1924 he returned to Scotland as Principal of the East of Scotland College of Agriculture and in 1926 became Professor of Agriculture at the University of Edinburgh.

In 1927 he was elected a Fellow of the Royal Society of Edinburgh. His proposers were Alexander Lauder, Sir James Walker, Anderson Gray McKendrick, and Ralph Allan Sampson.

He retired in 1944, and died on 14 September 1945. He was replaced by Professor Stephen John Watson.
