= List of Scottish statutory instruments, 2020 =

This is a complete list of Scottish statutory instruments in 2020.

== 1-100 ==
- The A76 Trunk Road (Castle, New Cumnock) (Temporary Prohibition on Waiting, Loading and Unloading) Order 2020 (S.S.I 2020 No. 1)
- The M8/A8 Trunk Road (Charing Cross) (Temporary Prohibition of Traffic) Order 2020 (S.S.I 2020 No. 2)
- The Royal Conservatoire of Scotland Amendment Order of Council 2020 (S.S.I 2020 No. 3)
- The Water and Sewerage Services to Dwellings (Collection of Unmetered Charges by Local Authority) (Scotland) Order 2020 (S.S.I 2020 No. 4)
- The Public Services Reform (The Scottish Public Services Ombudsman) (Healthcare Whistleblowing) Order 2020 (S.S.I 2020 No. 5)
- The Foods for Specific Groups (Infant Formula and Follow-on Formula) (Scotland) Regulations 2020 (S.S.I 2020 No. 6)
- The Foods for Specific Groups (Medical Foods for Infants) and Addition of Vitamins, Minerals and Other Substances (Scotland) Amendment Regulations 2020 (S.S.I 2020 No. 7)
- The A78 Trunk Road (Largs) (Temporary Prohibition on Waiting, Loading and Unloading) Order 2020 (S.S.I 2020 No. 8)
- The M8 (Newhouse to Easterhouse) M73 (Maryville to Mollinsburn) M74 (Daldowie to Hamilton) A725 (Shawhead to Whistleberry) Scotland Trunk Roads (Temporary Prohibitions of Traffic and Overtaking and Temporary Speed Restrictions) Order 2020 (S.S.I 2020 No. 9)
- The A84 Trunk Road (Callander) (Temporary Prohibition on Use of Road) Order 2020(S.S.I 2020 No. 10)
- The Social Security Assistance (Investigation of Offences) (Scotland) Regulations 2020 (S.S.I 2020 No. 11)
- The South West Scotland Trunk Roads (Temporary Prohibitions of Traffic and Overtaking and Temporary Speed Restrictions) Order 2020 (S.S.I 2020 No. 12)
- The South East Scotland Trunk Roads (Temporary Prohibitions of Traffic and Overtaking and Temporary Speed Restrictions) Order 2020 (S.S.I 2020 No. 13)
- The North West Scotland Trunk Roads (Temporary Prohibitions of Traffic and Overtaking and Temporary Speed Restrictions) Order 2020 (S.S.I 2020 No. 14)
- The North East Scotland Trunk Roads (Temporary Prohibitions of Traffic and Overtaking and Temporary Speed Restrictions) Order 2020 (S.S.I 2020 No. 15)
- The Personal Injuries (NHS Charges) (Amounts) (Scotland) Amendment Regulations 2020 (S.S.I 2020 No. 16)
- The National Health Service (Charges to Overseas Visitors) (Scotland) Amendment Regulations 2020 (S.S.I 2020 No. 17)
- The Direct Payments to Farmers (Legislative Continuity) (Scotland) (Miscellaneous Amendments) Regulations 2020 (S.S.I 2020 No. 18)
- The A82 Trunk Road (Inverness West Link) (Temporary Vehicle Weight Restriction) Order 2020 (S.S.I 2020 No. 19)
- The Land Reform (Scotland) Act 2016 (Commencement No. 10) Regulations 2020 (S.S.I 2020 No. 20 (C. 1))
- The Right to Buy Land to Further Sustainable Development (Applications, Written Requests, Ballots and Compensation) (Scotland) Regulations 2020 (S.S.I 2020 No. 21)
- The Lands Tribunal for Scotland Amendment (Fees) Rules 2020 (S.S.I 2020 No. 22)
- The Civil Litigation (Expenses and Group Proceedings) (Scotland) Act 2018 (Commencement No. 2 and Transitional Provision) Regulations 2020 (S.S.I 2020 No. 23 (C. 2))
- The Land and Buildings Transaction Tax (Tax Rates and Tax Bands) (Scotland) Amendment Order 2020 (S.S.I 2020 No. 24)
- The Council Tax Reduction (Scotland) Amendment Regulations 2020 (S.S.I 2020 No. 25)
- The Local Governance (Scotland) Act 2004 (Remuneration) Amendment Regulations 2020 (S.S.I 2020 No. 26)
- Act of Adjournal (Criminal Procedure Rules 1996 Amendment) (Miscellaneous) 2020 (S.S.I 2020 No. 27)
- Act of Sederunt (Rules of the Court of Session 1994, Sheriff Appeal Court Rules and Sheriff Court Rules Amendment) (Reporting Restrictions) 2020 (S.S.I 2020 No. 28)
- The A77 Trunk Road (Maybole) (Prohibition of Waiting, Loading and Unloading) Order 2020 (S.S.I 2020 No. 29)
- The National Health Service Superannuation and Pension Schemes (Miscellaneous Amendments) (Scotland) Regulations 2020 (S.S.I 2020 No. 30)
- The Local Government Pension Scheme (Miscellaneous Amendments) (Scotland) Regulations 2020 (S.S.I 2020 No. 31)
- The Carer’s Allowance Up-rating (Miscellaneous Amendments) (Scotland) Regulations 2020 (S.S.I 2020 No. 32)
- The Police Pensions (Amendment) (Scotland) Regulations 2020 (S.S.I 2020 No. 33)
- The Marketing of Fruit Plant and Propagating Material (Scotland) Amendment Regulations 2020 (S.S.I 2020 No. 34)
- The Scottish Road Works Register (Prescribed Fees) Regulations 2020 (revoked) (S.S.I 2020 No. 35)
- The Non-Domestic Rates (Reverse Vending Machine Relief) (Scotland) Regulations 2020 (S.S.I 2020 No. 36)
- The Non-Domestic Rate (Scotland) Order 2020 (S.S.I 2020 No. 37)
- The Non-Domestic Rates (Enterprise Areas) (Scotland) Amendment Regulations 2020 (S.S.I 2020 No. 38)
- The Non-Domestic Rates (Levying) (Scotland) Regulations 2020 (revoked) (S.S.I 2020 No. 39)
- The Non-Domestic Rates (Relief for New and Improved Properties) (Scotland) Amendment Regulations 2020 (revoked) (S.S.I 2020 No. 40)
- The Non-Domestic Rates (Telecommunication Installations) (Scotland) Amendment Regulations 2020 (S.S.I 2020 No. 41)
- The Non-Domestic Rates (Transitional Relief) (Scotland) Amendment Regulations 2020 (S.S.I 2020 No. 42)
- The Non-Domestic Rating (Unoccupied Property) (Scotland) Amendment Regulations 2020 (S.S.I 2020 No. 43)
- The Non-Domestic Rating (Valuation of Utilities) (Scotland) Amendment Order 2020 (S.S.I 2020 No. 44)
- The Rehabilitation of Offenders Act 1974 (Exclusions and Exceptions) (Scotland) Amendment Order 2020 (S.S.I 2020 No. 45)
- The South East Scotland Trunk Roads (Temporary Prohibitions of Traffic and Overtaking and Temporary Speed Restrictions) (No. 2) Order 2020 (S.S.I 2020 No. 46)
- The North West Scotland Trunk Roads (Temporary Prohibitions of Traffic and Overtaking and Temporary Speed Restrictions) (No. 2) Order 2020 (S.S.I 2020 No. 47)
- The North East Scotland Trunk Roads (Temporary Prohibitions of Traffic and Overtaking and Temporary Speed Restrictions) (No. 2) Order 2020 (S.S.I 2020 No. 48)
- The UEFA European Championship (Scotland) Act 2020 (Commencement No. 1) Regulations 2020 (S.S.I 2020 No. 49 (C. 3))
- The M8 (Newhouse to Easterhouse), M73 (Maryville to Mollinsburn), A8 (Newhouse to Bargeddie) and A725 (Shawhead to Whistleberry) Trunk Roads (Temporary Prohibitions of Traffic and Overtaking and Temporary Speed Restrictions) Order 2020 (S.S.I 2020 No. 50)
- The Public Health etc. (Scotland) Act 2008 (Notifiable Diseases and Notifiable Organisms) Amendment Regulations 2020 (S.S.I 2020 No. 51)
- The Relevant Adjustments to Common Parts (Disabled Persons) (Scotland) Regulations 2020 (S.S.I 2020 No. 52)
- The A83 Trunk Road (Lochgilphead) (Temporary Prohibition on Waiting, Loading and Unloading) Order 2020 (S.S.I 2020 No. 53)
- The National Assistance (Assessment of Resources) Amendment (Scotland) Regulations 2020 (S.S.I 2020 No. 54)
- The National Assistance (Assessment of Resources) Amendment (Scotland) (No. 2) Regulations 2020 (S.S.I 2020 No. 55)
- The National Assistance (Sums for Personal Requirements) (Scotland) Regulations 2020 (revoked) (S.S.I 2020 No. 56)
- The A828 Trunk Road (Ledaig) (Temporary Prohibition on Use of Road and Temporary 30 mph Speed Restriction) Order 2020 (S.S.I 2020 No. 57)
- The Fuel Poverty (Enhanced Heating) (Scotland) Regulations 2020 (S.S.I 2020 No. 58)
- The Fuel Poverty (Additional Amount in respect of Remote Rural Area, Remote Small Town and Island Area) (Scotland) Regulations 2020 (S.S.I 2020 No. 59)
- The A898 and A82 Trunk Roads (Erskine Bridge at Clydebank to Old Kilpatrick) (Temporary 10 mph Speed Restriction) Order 2020 (S.S.I 2020 No. 60)
- The A726 Trunk Road (College Milton) (Temporary 30 mph Speed Restriction) Order 2020 (S.S.I 2020 No. 61)
- The Representation of the People (Annual Canvass) Amendment (Scotland) Order 2020 (S.S.I 2020 No. 62)
- The Representation of the People (Data Matching) (Scotland) Regulations 2020 (S.S.I 2020 No. 63)
- The Council Tax Reduction (Scotland) Amendment (No. 2) Regulations 2020 (revoked) (S.S.I 2020 No. 64)
- The Scottish Landfill Tax (Standard Rate and Lower Rate) Order 2020 (S.S.I 2020 No. 65)
- The Climate Change (Emissions Reduction Targets) (Scotland) Act 2019 (Commencement) Regulations 2020 (S.S.I 2020 No. 66 (C. 4))
- The Planning (Scotland) Act 2019 (Commencement No. 4 and Transitional Provision) Regulations 2020 (S.S.I 2020 No. 67 (C. 5))
- The Transport (Scotland) Act 2019 (Commencement No. 2) Regulations 2020 (S.S.I 2020 No. 68 (C. 6))
- The A78 Trunk Road (Gallowgate Street, Largs) (Temporary Prohibition on Waiting, Loading and Unloading) Order 2020 (S.S.I 2020 No. 69)
- The A9 Trunk Road (Tomatin) (Temporary Prohibition on Use of Road and Temporary 20 mph Speed Restriction) Order 2020 (S.S.I 2020 No. 70)
- The A95 Trunk Road (Grantown-on-Spey) (Temporary 20 mph Speed Restriction) Order 2020 (S.S.I 2020 No. 71)
- The A78 Trunk Road (Gallowgate Street, Largs) (Temporary Prohibition on Waiting, Loading and Unloading) (No.2) Order 2020 (S.S.I 2020 No. 72)
- The Revenue Scotland and Tax Powers Act 2014 Amendment Regulations 2020 (S.S.I 2020 No. 73)
- The Age of Criminal Responsibility (Scotland) Act 2019 (Commencement No. 2) Regulations 2020 (S.S.I 2020 No. 74 (C. 7))
- The Social Security (Scotland) Act 2018 (Commencement No. 6) Regulations 2020 (S.S.I 2020 No. 75 (C. 8))
- The Census (Scotland) Order 2020 (S.S.I 2020 No. 76)
- The Scottish Crown Estate Act 2019 (Commencement No. 2 and Saving Provisions) Regulations 2020 (S.S.I 2020 No. 77 (C. 9))
- The A78 Trunk Road (Gallowgate Street, Largs) (Temporary Prohibition on Waiting, Loading and Unloading) (No. 3) Order 2020 (S.S.I 2020 No. 78)
- The UEFA European Championship (Scotland) Act 2020 (Compensation for Enforcement Action) (Scotland) Regulations 2020 (S.S.I 2020 No. 79)
- The Human Tissue (Authorisation) (Specified Type A Procedures) (Scotland) Regulations 2020 (S.S.I 2020 No. 80)
- The Alcohol (Minimum Price per Unit) (Scotland) Amendment Order 2020 (S.S.I 2020 No. 81)
- The Public Appointments and Public Bodies etc. (Scotland) Act 2003 (Amendment of Specified Authorities) Order 2020 (S.S.I 2020 No. 82)
- The Community Care (Personal Care and Nursing Care) (Scotland) Amendment Regulations 2020 (revoked) (S.S.I 2020 No. 83)
- The A83 Trunk Road (Lochnell Street, Lochgilphead) (Temporary Prohibition on Use of Road) Order 2020 (S.S.I 2020 No. 84)
- The South of Scotland Enterprise Act 2019 (Commencement and Transitional Provision) Amendment Regulations 2020 (S.S.I 2020 No. 85 (C. 10))
- The Bovine Viral Diarrhoea (Scotland) Amendment Order 2020 (S.S.I 2020 No. 86)
- The North East Scotland Trunk Roads (Temporary Prohibitions of Traffic and Overtaking and Temporary Speed Restrictions) (No. 3) Order 2020 (S.S.I 2020 No. 87)
- The South East Scotland Trunk Roads (Temporary Prohibitions of Traffic and Overtaking and Temporary Speed Restrictions) (No. 3) Order 2020 (S.S.I 2020 No. 88)
- The South West Scotland Trunk Roads (Temporary Prohibitions of Traffic and Overtaking and Temporary Speed Restrictions) (No. 2) Order 2020 (S.S.I 2020 No. 89)
- The North West Scotland Trunk Roads (Temporary Prohibitions of Traffic and Overtaking and Temporary Speed Restrictions) (No. 3) Order 2020 (S.S.I 2020 No. 90)
- The Budget (Scotland) Act 2019 Amendment Regulations 2020 (S.S.I 2020 No. 91)
- The Public Services Reform (Registers of Scotland) Order 2020 (S.S.I 2020 No. 92)
- Act of Adjournal (Criminal Procedure (Scotland) Act 1995 Amendment) (Miscellaneous) 2020 (S.S.I 2020 No. 93)
- The M8 (Newhouse to Easterhouse) M73 (Maryville to Mollinsburn) M74 (Daldowie to Hamilton) A8 (Newhouse to Bargeddie) A725 (Shawhead to Whistleberry) A7071 (Bellshill) Trunk Roads (Temporary Prohibitions of Traffic and Overtaking and Temporary Speed Restrictions) Order 2020 (S.S.I 2020 No. 94)
- The First-tier Tribunal for Scotland (Transfer of Functions of Parking Adjudicators) Regulations 2020 (S.S.I 2020 No. 95)
- The First-tier Tribunal for Scotland (Transfer of Functions of Bus Lane Adjudicators) Regulations 2020 (S.S.I 2020 No. 96)
- The First-tier Tribunal for Scotland General Regulatory Chamber Parking and Bus Lane Cases and Upper Tribunal for Scotland (Composition) Regulations 2020 (S.S.I 2020 No. 97)
- The First-tier Tribunal for Scotland General Regulatory Chamber Parking and Bus Lane Appeals (Rules of Procedure) Regulations 2020 (S.S.I 2020 No. 98)
- The Funeral Expense Assistance and Young Carer Grants (Up-rating) (Miscellaneous Amendments) (Scotland) Regulations 2020 (S.S.I 2020 No. 99)
- The First-tier Tribunal for Scotland Social Security Chamber (Procedure and Allocation of Functions) Amendment Regulations 2020 (S.S.I 2020 No. 100)

== 101-200 ==
- The Non-Domestic Rates (Coronavirus Reliefs) (Scotland) Regulations 2020 (S.S.I 2020 No. 101)
- The Local Government Finance (Scotland) Order 2020 (S.S.I 2020 No. 102)
- The Health Protection (Coronavirus) (Restrictions) (Scotland) Regulations 2020 (revoked) (S.S.I 2020 No. 103)
- The National Bus Travel Concession Scheme for Older and Disabled Persons (Scotland) Amendment Order 2020 (S.S.I 2020 No. 104)
- The Scottish Landfill Tax (Standard Rate and Lower Rate) (No. 2) Order 2020 (revoked) (S.S.I 2020 No. 105)
- The Health Protection (Coronavirus) (Restrictions) (Scotland) Amendment Regulations 2020 (revoked) (S.S.I 2020 No. 106)
- The Non-Domestic Rates (Scotland) Act 2020 (Commencement No. 1 and Transitional Provision) Regulations 2020 (S.S.I 2020 No. 107 (C. 11))
- The Council Tax Reduction (Scotland) Amendment (No. 3) (Coronavirus) Regulations 2020 (S.S.I 2020 No. 108)
- The Public Appointments and Public Bodies etc. (Scotland) Act 2003 (Treatment of Consumer Scotland as Specified Authority) Order 2020 (S.S.I 2020 No. 109)
- The Civil Litigation (Expenses and Group Proceedings) (Scotland) Act 2018 (Success Fee Agreements) Regulations 2020 (S.S.I 2020 No. 110)
- The Scottish Courts and Tribunals Service (Judicial Members) Amendment Order 2020 (S.S.I 2020 No. 111)
- The Scottish Courts and Tribunals Service (Procedure for Appointment of Members) Amendment Regulations 2020 (S.S.I 2020 No. 112)
- The Representation of the People (Annual Canvass) (Miscellaneous Amendments) (Scotland) Regulations 2020 (S.S.I 2020 No. 113)
- The Right to Buy Land to Further Sustainable Development (Eligible Land, Specified Types of Area and Restrictions on Transfers, Assignations and Dealing) (Scotland) Regulations 2020 (S.S.I 2020 No. 114)
- The Social Security (Advocacy Service Standards) (Scotland) Regulations 2020 (S.S.I 2020 No. 115)
- The Carer’s Allowance Up-rating (Scotland) Order 2020 (S.S.I 2020 No. 116)
- The Carer's Allowance (Coronavirus) (Breaks in Care) (Scotland) Regulations 2020 (S.S.I 2020 No. 117)
- The Single Use Carrier Bags Charge (Scotland) Amendment Regulations 2020 (S.S.I 2020 No. 118)
- The Gender Representation on Public Boards (Scotland) Act 2018 (Commencement No. 2) Regulations 2020 (S.S.I 2020 No. 119 (C. 12))
- The Gender Representation on Public Boards (Scotland) Act 2018 (Reports) Regulations 2020 (S.S.I 2020 No. 120)
- The Coronavirus Act 2020 (Commencement No. 1) (Scotland) Regulations 2020 (S.S.I 2020 No. 121 (C. 13))
- The Prisons and Young Offenders Institutions (Scotland) Amendment Rules 2020 (S.S.I 2020 No. 122)
- The Electricity Works (Miscellaneous Temporary Modifications) (Coronavirus) (Scotland) Regulations 2020 (S.S.I 2020 No. 123)
- The Town and Country Planning (Miscellaneous Temporary Modifications) (Coronavirus) (Scotland) Regulations 2020 (S.S.I 2020 No. 124)
- The A9 Trunk Road (Berriedale Braes) (Temporary Prohibitions of Traffic and Overtaking and Temporary 30 mph Speed Restriction) Order 2020 (S.S.I 2020 No. 125)
- The Health Protection (Coronavirus) (Restrictions) (Scotland) Amendment (No. 2) Regulations 2020 (revoked) (S.S.I 2020 No. 126)
- The Social Security (Scotland) Act 2018 (Commencement No. 7) Regulations 2020 (S.S.I 2020 No. 127 (C. 14))
- The Education (Miscellaneous Amendments) (Coronavirus) (Scotland) Regulations 2020 (S.S.I 2020 No. 128)
- The Town and Country Planning (General Permitted Development) (Coronavirus) (Scotland) Amendment Order 2020 (S.S.I 2020 No. 129)
- Not Allocated (S.S.I 2020 No. 130)
- The North East Scotland Trunk Roads (Temporary Prohibitions of Traffic and Overtaking and Temporary Speed Restrictions) (No. 4) Order 2020 (S.S.I 2020 No. 131)
- The North West Scotland Trunk Roads (Temporary Prohibitions of Traffic and Overtaking and Temporary Speed Restrictions) (No. 4) Order 2020 (S.S.I 2020 No. 132)
- The South East Scotland Trunk Roads (Temporary Prohibitions of Traffic and Overtaking and Temporary Speed Restrictions) (No. 4) Order 2020 (S.S.I 2020 No. 133)
- The South West Scotland Trunk Roads (Temporary Prohibitions of Traffic and Overtaking and Temporary Speed Restrictions) (No. 3) Order 2020 (S.S.I 2020 No. 134)
- The Direct Payments (Crop Diversification Derogation) (Scotland) Regulations 2020 (S.S.I 2020 No. 135)
- The Children and Young People (Scotland) Act 2014 (Modification) (No. 2) Revocation Order 2020 (S.S.I 2020 No. 136)
- The Criminal Justice (Miscellaneous Temporary Modifications) (Coronavirus) (Scotland) Regulations 2020 (S.S.I 2020 No. 137)
- The Release of Prisoners (Coronavirus) (Scotland) Regulations 2020 (S.S.I 2020 No. 138)
- The Homeless Persons (Unsuitable Accommodation) (Scotland) Amendment Order 2020 (revoked) (S.S.I 2020 No. 139)
- The Public Services Reform (Scotland) Act 2010 (Part 2 Further Extension) Order 2020 (S.S.I 2020 No. 140)
- The Fuel Poverty (Targets, Definition and Strategy) (Scotland) Act 2019 (Scottish Fuel Poverty Advisory Panel and Consequential Amendments) Regulations 2020 (S.S.I 2020 No. 141)
- The M8 (Newhouse to Easterhouse) M73 (Maryville to Mollinsburn) M74 (Daldowie to Hamilton) A725 (Shawhead to Whistleberry) Scotland Trunk Roads (Temporary Prohibitions of Traffic and Overtaking and Temporary Speed Restrictions) (No. 2) Order 2020 (S.S.I 2020 No. 142)
- The Census (Scotland) Regulations 2020 (S.S.I 2020 No. 143)
- The Town and Country Planning (Changing Places Toilet Facilities) (Scotland) Regulations 2020 (S.S.I 2020 No. 144)
- The A78 Trunk Road (West Kilbride incorporating Seamill) (30 mph Speed Limit) Order 2020 (S.S.I 2020 No. 145)
- The Freedom of Information (Scotland) Act 2002 (Scottish Public Authorities) Amendment Order 2020 (S.S.I 2020 No. 146)
- The South of Scotland Enterprise (Transfer of Property and Liabilities) (Scotland) Regulations 2020 (S.S.I 2020 No. 147)
- The Seed (Fees) (Scotland) Amendment Regulations 2020 (S.S.I 2020 No. 148)
- The Education (Deemed Decisions) (Coronavirus) (Scotland) Amendment Regulations 2020 (S.S.I 2020 No. 149)
- The Education (Scotland) Act 1980 (Modification) Regulations 2020 (S.S.I 2020 No. 150)
- The Adults with Incapacity (Ethics Committee) (Scotland) (Coronavirus) Amendment Regulations 2020 (S.S.I 2020 No. 151)
- The Plant Health (Official Controls and Miscellaneous Provisions) (Scotland) Amendment Regulations 2020 (revoked) (S.S.I 2020 No. 152)
- The Nutritional Requirements for Food and Drink in Schools (Scotland) Regulations 2020 (S.S.I 2020 No. 153)
- The Deposit and Return Scheme for Scotland Regulations 2020 (S.S.I 2020 No. 154)
- The Environmental Regulation (Enforcement Measures) (Scotland) Amendment Order 2020 (S.S.I 2020 No. 155)
- The Food Information and Addition of Vitamins, Minerals and Other Substances (Scotland) Amendment Regulations 2020 (S.S.I 2020 No. 156)
- The Marine Works and Marine Licensing (Miscellaneous Temporary Modifications) (Coronavirus) (Scotland) Regulations 2020 (S.S.I 2020 No. 157)
- The North West Scotland Trunk Roads (Temporary Prohibitions of Traffic and Overtaking and Temporary Speed Restrictions) (No. 5) Order 2020 (S.S.I 2020 No. 158)
- The North East Scotland Trunk Roads (Temporary Prohibitions of Traffic and Overtaking and Temporary Speed Restrictions) (No. 5) Order 2020 (S.S.I 2020 No. 159)
- The South East Scotland Trunk Roads (Temporary Prohibitions of Traffic and Overtaking and Temporary Speed Restrictions) (No. 5) Order 2020 (S.S.I 2020 No. 160)
- The M8 (Newhouse to Easterhouse), M73 (Maryville to Mollinsburn), A8 (Newhouse to Bargeddie) and A725 (Shawhead to Whistleberry) Trunk Roads (Temporary Prohibitions of Traffic and Overtaking and Temporary Speed Restrictions) (No. 2) Order 2020 (S.S.I 2020 No. 161)
- The Scottish Elections (Franchise and Representation) Act 2020 (Commencement) Regulations 2020 (S.S.I 2020 No. 162 (C. 15))
- The Police Act 1997 and the Protection of Vulnerable Groups (Scotland) Act 2007 (Fees) (Coronavirus) Regulations 2020 (S.S.I 2020 No. 163)
- The Health Protection (Coronavirus) (Restrictions) (Scotland) Amendment (No. 3) Regulations 2020 (revoked) (S.S.I. 2020 No. 164)
- The Seed and Plant Material (Miscellaneous Amendments) (Scotland) Regulations 2020 (S.S.I 2020 No. 165)
- Act of Sederunt (Rules of the Court of Session 1994 and Sheriff Court Rules Amendment) (Miscellaneous) 2020 (S.S.I 2020 No. 166)
- The Civil Litigation (Expenses and Group Proceedings) (Scotland) Act 2018 (Commencement No. 3) Regulations 2020 (S.S.I 2020 No. 167 (C. 16))
- The Marking of Creels (Scotland) Order 2020 (S.S.I 2020 No. 168)
- The Health Protection (Coronavirus) (International Travel) (Scotland) Regulations 2020 (revoked) (S.S.I 2020 No. 169)
- The Health Protection (Coronavirus, Public Health Information for Passengers Travelling to Scotland) Regulations 2020 (revoked) (S.S.I 2020 No. 170)
- The Health Protection (Coronavirus) (International Travel) (Scotland) Amendment Regulations 2020 (revoked) (S.S.I 2020 No. 171)
- The Glasgow Caledonian University Amendment Order of Council 2020 (S.S.I 2020 No. 172)
- The Highland Council (Uig, Isle of Skye) Harbour Revision Order 2020 (S.S.I 2020 No. 173)
- The Land Reform (Scotland) Act 2016 (Supplementary Provision) (Coronavirus) Regulations 2020 (S.S.I 2020 No. 174)
- The Prisons and Young Offenders Institutions (Coronavirus) (Scotland) Amendment Rules 2020 (S.S.I 2020 No. 175)
- The Plant Health (Official Controls and Miscellaneous Provisions) (Miscellaneous Amendments) (Scotland) Regulations 2020 (S.S.I 2020 No. 176)
- The Scottish Animal Welfare Commission Regulations 2020 (S.S.I 2020 No. 177)
- The A78 Trunk Road (Seamill) (Temporary 30 mph Speed Restriction) Revocation Order 2020 (S.S.I 2020 No. 178)
- The Scottish Parliament (Elections etc.) Amendment Order 2020 (S.S.I 2020 No. 179)
- The Representation of the People (Scotland) Amendment Regulations 2020 (S.S.I 2020 No. 180)
- The A726 Trunk Road (College Milton) (Temporary 30 mph Speed Restriction) (No. 2) Order 2020 (S.S.I 2020 No. 181)
- The Health Protection (Coronavirus) (Restrictions) (Scotland) Amendment (No. 4) Regulations 2020 (revoked) (S.S.I 2020 No. 182)
- The Period Products in Schools (Scotland) Regulations 2020 (revoked) (S.S.I 2020 No. 183)
- The Health Protection (Coronavirus) (International Travel) (Scotland) Amendment (No. 2) Regulations 2020 (revoked) (S.S.I 2020 No. 184)
- The A77 Trunk Road (Glendoune Street, Girvan) (Temporary Prohibition on Waiting, Loading and Unloading) Order 2020 (S.S.I 2020 No. 185)
- The M8 (Newhouse to Easterhouse) M73 (Maryville to Mollinsburn) M74 (Daldowie to Hamilton) A8 (Newhouse to Bargeddie) A725 (Shawhead to Whistleberry) A7071 (Bellshill) Trunk Roads (Temporary Prohibitions of Traffic and Overtaking and Temporary Speed Restrictions) (No. 2) Order 2020 (S.S.I 2020 No. 186)
- The Local Government Finance (Coronavirus) (Scotland) Amendment Order 2020 (S.S.I 2020 No. 187)
- The Social Care Staff Support Fund (Coronavirus) (Scotland) Regulations 2020 (S.S.I 2020 No. 188)
- The UEFA European Championship (Scotland) Act 2020 (Commencement No. 2) Regulations 2020 (S.S.I 2020 No. 189 (C. 17))
- The Health Protection (Coronavirus) (Restrictions) (Scotland) Amendment (No. 5) Regulations 2020 (revoked) (S.S.I 2020 No. 190)
- The Legal Aid and Advice and Assistance (Miscellaneous Amendments) (Coronavirus) (Scotland) Regulations 2020 (S.S.I 2020 No. 191)
- The South West Scotland Trunk Roads (Temporary Prohibitions of Traffic and Overtaking and Temporary Speed Restrictions) (No. 4) Order 2020 (S.S.I 2020 No. 192)
- The South East Scotland Trunk Roads (Temporary Prohibitions of Traffic and Overtaking and Temporary Speed Restrictions) (No. 6) Order 2020 (S.S.I 2020 No. 193)
- The North West Scotland Trunk Roads (Temporary Prohibitions of Traffic and Overtaking and Temporary Speed Restrictions) (No. 6) Order 2020 (S.S.I 2020 No. 194)
- The North East Scotland Trunk Roads (Temporary Prohibitions of Traffic and Overtaking and Temporary Speed Restrictions) (No. 6) Order 2020 (S.S.I 2020 No. 195)
- The A78 Trunk Road (Greenock) (Temporary Prohibition of Traffic) Order 2020 (S.S.I 2020 No. 196)
- The Budget (Scotland) Act 2020 Amendment Regulations 2020 (S.S.I 2020 No. 197)
- Act of Sederunt (Rules of the Court of Session 1994 and Sheriff Court Company Insolvency Rules Amendment) (Insolvency) 2020 (S.S.I 2020 No. 198)
- The Health Protection (Coronavirus) (Restrictions) (Scotland) Amendment (No. 6) Regulations 2020 (revoked) (S.S.I 2020 No. 199)
- Act of Adjournal (Criminal Procedure Rules 1996 Amendment) (Jury Ballot) 2020 (S.S.I 2020 No. 200)

== 201-300 ==
- The Care Homes Emergency Intervention Orders (Coronavirus) (Scotland) Regulations 2020 (S.S.I 2020 No. 201)
- The A78 Trunk Road (Greenock) (Temporary Prohibition on Use of Road) (No. 2) Order 2020 (S.S.I 2020 No. 202)
- The A835 and A893 Trunk Road (Tore - Ullapool) (Temporary Prohibition of Use, Pedestrians and Waiting, Loading and Unloading) Order 2020 (S.S.I 2020 No. 203)
- The UEFA European Championship (Scotland) Act 2020 (Ticket Touting Offence) (Exceptions for Use of Internet etc.) (Scotland) Regulations 2020 (S.S.I 2020 No. 204)
- The Registration of Independent Schools (Prescribed Person) (Coronavirus) (Scotland) Amendment Regulations 2020 (S.S.I 2020 No. 205)
- The A84/A85 Trunk Road (Loch Lubnaig) (Temporary 30 mph Speed Restriction) Order 2020 (S.S.I 2020 No. 206)
- The A82 Trunk Road (Falls of Falloch) (Temporary 30 mph Speed Restriction) Order 2020 (S.S.I 2020 No. 207)
- Act of Sederunt (Rules of the Court of Session 1994 Amendment) (Group Proceedings) 2020 (S.S.I 2020 No. 208)
- The Health Protection (Coronavirus) (International Travel) (Scotland) Amendment (No. 3) Regulations 2020 (revoked) (S.S.I 2020 No. 209)
- The Health Protection (Coronavirus) (Restrictions) (Scotland) Amendment (No. 7) Regulations 2020 (revoked) (S.S.I 2020 No. 210)
- The Health Protection (Coronavirus) (Restrictions) (Scotland) Amendment (No. 8) Regulations 2020 (revoked) (S.S.I 2020 No. 211)
- The Public Appointments and Public Bodies etc. (Scotland) Act 2003 (Treatment of Non-executive Directors of the Scottish National Investment Bank p.l.c. as Specified Authorities) Order 2020 (S.S.I 2020 No. 212)
- The Education (Fees and Student Support) (Miscellaneous Amendments) (Scotland) Regulations 2020 (S.S.I 2020 No. 213)
- The A76 Trunk Road (High Street, Sanquhar) (Temporary Prohibition on Waiting, Loading and Unloading) Order 2020 (S.S.I 2020 No. 214)
- The Land and Buildings Transaction Tax (Tax Rates and Tax Bands) (Scotland) Amendment (No. 2) (Coronavirus) Order 2020 (S.S.I 2020 No. 215)
- The A830 Trunk Road (Glenfinnan) (40 mph Speed Limit) Order 2020 (S.S.I 2020 No. 216)
- The A83 Trunk Road (Arrochar) (Temporary 30 mph Speed Restriction) Order 2020 (S.S.I 2020 No. 217)
- The Personal Independence Payment (Transitional Provisions) Amendment (Scotland) Regulations 2020 (S.S.I 2020 No. 218)
- The A82 Trunk Road (Falls of Falloch) (Temporary Clearway) Order 2020 (S.S.I 2020 No. 219)
- The A78 Trunk Road (Branchton) (Temporary Prohibition of Specified Turns) Order 2020 (S.S.I 2020 No. 220)
- The Health Protection (Coronavirus) (International Travel) (Scotland) Amendment (No. 4) Regulations 2020 (revoked) (S.S.I 2020 No. 221)
- The A84/A85 Trunk Road (Loch Lubnaig) (Temporary Clearway) Order 2020 (S.S.I. 2020 No. 222)
- The M8 (Newhouse to Easterhouse) M73 (Maryville to Mollinsburn) M74 (Daldowie to Hamilton) A725 (Shawhead to Whistleberry) Scotland Trunk Roads (Temporary Prohibitions of Traffic and Overtaking and Temporary Speed Restrictions) (No. 3) Order 2020 (S.S.I. 2020 No. 223)
- The Health Protection (Coronavirus) (International Travel) (Scotland) Amendment (No. 5) Regulations 2020 (revoked) (S.S.I. 2020 No. 224)
- The North East Scotland Trunk Roads (Temporary Prohibitions of Traffic and Overtaking and Temporary Speed Restrictions) (No. 7) Order 2020 (S.S.I. 2020 No. 225)
- The North West Scotland Trunk Roads (Temporary Prohibitions of Traffic and Overtaking and Temporary Speed Restrictions) (No. 7) Order 2020 (S.S.I 2020 No. 226)
- The South East Scotland Trunk Roads (Temporary Prohibitions of Traffic and Overtaking and Temporary Speed Restrictions) (No. 7) Order 2020 (S.S.I 2020 No. 227)
- The South West Scotland Trunk Roads (Temporary Prohibitions of Traffic and Overtaking and Temporary Speed Restrictions) (No. 5) Order 2020 (S.S.I 2020 No. 228)
- The Health Protection (Coronavirus) (International Travel) (Scotland) Amendment (No. 6) Regulations 2020 (revoked) (S.S.I 2020 No. 229)
- The Non-Domestic Rates (Coronavirus Reliefs) (Scotland) Amendment Regulations 2020 (S.S.I 2020 No. 230)
- The A85 Trunk Road (Comrie) (Temporary Prohibition of Use, Pedestrians and Waiting, Loading and Unloading) Order 2020 (S.S.I 2020 No. 231)
- The Health Protection (Coronavirus) (Restrictions) (Scotland) Amendment (No. 9) Regulations 2020 (revoked) (S.S.I 2020 No. 232)
- The Health Protection (Coronavirus) (International Travel) (Scotland) Amendment (No. 7) Regulations 2020 (revoked) (S.S.I 2020 No. 233)
- The Health Protection (Coronavirus, Restrictions) (Aberdeen City) Regulations 2020 (S.S.I 2020 No. 234)
- The Health Protection (Coronavirus) (International Travel) (Scotland) Amendment (No. 8) Regulations 2020 (revoked) (S.S.I 2020 No. 235)
- The Health Protection (Coronavirus) (Restrictions) (Scotland) Amendment (No. 10) Regulations 2020 (revoked) (S.S.I 2020 No. 236)
- The Victims and Witnesses (Scotland) Act 2014 (Commencement No. 6) Order 2020 (S.S.I. 2020 No. 237 (C. 18))
- The M90/A90/A9000 Trunk Road (Queensferry Crossing) (Temporary Prohibition on Use of Road) Order 2020 (S.S.I 2020 No. 238)
- The Scottish Local Government Elections Amendment Order 2020 (S.S.I 2020 No. 239)
- The Representation of the People (Absent Voting at Local Government Elections) (Amendment) (Coronavirus) (Scotland) Regulations 2020 (S.S.I 2020 No. 240)
- The Health Protection (Coronavirus) (Restrictions) (Scotland) Amendment (No. 11) Regulations 2020 (revoked) (S.S.I 2020 No. 241)
- The Health Protection (Coronavirus) (International Travel) (Scotland) Amendment (No. 9) Regulations 2020 (revoked) (S.S.I 2020 No. 242)
- The Children’s Hearings (Scotland) Act 2011 (Commencement No. 10) Order 2020 (S.S.I 2020 No. 243 (C. 19))
- The Direct Payments to Farmers (Controls) (Coronavirus) (Scotland) Regulations 2020 (S.S.I 2020 No. 244)
- The Management of Offenders (Scotland) Act 2019 (Commencement No. 4 and Saving Provision) Regulations 2020 (S.S.I 2020 No. 245 (C. 20))
- The Mental Health Tribunal for Scotland (Practice and Procedure) (No. 2) Amendment Rules 2020 (S.S.I 2020 No. 246)
- The A83 Trunk Road (Arrochar) (Temporary Prohibition on Stopping, Waiting, Loading and Unloading) Order 2020 (S.S.I 2020 No. 247)
- The A830 Trunk Road (Morar) (Temporary Clearway) Order 2020 (S.S.I 2020 No. 248)
- The Coronavirus (Scotland) Acts (Early Expiry of Provisions) Regulations 2020 (S.S.I 2020 No. 249)
- The Scottish Biometrics Commissioner Act 2020 (Commencement) Regulations 2020 (S.S.I 2020 No. 250 (C. 21))
- The Health Protection (Coronavirus) (Restrictions) (Scotland) Amendment (No. 12) Regulations 2020 (revoked) (S.S.I 2020 No. 251)
- The Health Protection (Coronavirus) (International Travel) (Scotland) Amendment (No. 10) Regulations 2020 (revoked) (S.S.I 2020 No. 252)
- The Health Protection (Coronavirus, Restrictions) (Aberdeen City) Amendment Regulations 2020 (S.S.I 2020 No. 253)
- The Town and Country Planning (Emergency Period and Extended Period) (Coronavirus) (Scotland) Regulations 2020 (S.S.I 2020 No. 254)
- The North East Scotland Trunk Roads (Temporary Prohibitions of Traffic and Overtaking and Temporary Speed Restrictions) (No. 8) Order 2020 (S.S.I 2020 No. 255)
- The North West Scotland Trunk Roads (Temporary Prohibitions of Traffic and Overtaking and Temporary Speed Restrictions) (No. 8) Order 2020 (S.S.I 2020 No. 256)
- The South East Scotland Trunk Roads (Temporary Prohibitions of Traffic and Overtaking and Temporary Speed Restrictions) (No. 8) Order 2020 (S.S.I 2020 No. 257)
- The National Health Service (Free Prescriptions and Charges for Drugs and Appliances) (Scotland) Amendment Regulations 2020 (revoked) (S.S.I 2020 No. 258)
- The M8 (Newhouse to Easterhouse), M73 (Maryville to Mollinsburn), A8 (Newhouse to Bargeddie) and A725 (Shawhead to Whistleberry) Trunk Roads (Temporary Prohibitions of Traffic and Overtaking and Temporary Speed Restrictions) (No. 3) Order 2020 (S.S.I 2020 No. 259)
- The Coronavirus (Scotland) Act 2020 (Suspension: Muirburn) Regulations 2020 (S.S.I 2020 No. 260)
- The Health Protection (Coronavirus) (Restrictions) (Scotland) Amendment (No. 13) Regulations 2020 (revoked) (S.S.I 2020 No. 261)
- The Health Protection (Coronavirus, Restrictions) (Directions by Local Authorities) (Scotland) Regulations 2020 (S.S.I 2020 No. 262)
- The Health Protection (Coronavirus) (International Travel) (Scotland) Amendment (No. 11) Regulations 2020 (revoked) (S.S.I 2020 No. 263)
- The Prisons and Young Offenders Institutions (Coronavirus) (Scotland) Amendment (No. 2) Rules 2020 (S.S.I 2020 No. 264)
- The A92 Trunk Road (Halbeath to Crossgates) (Temporary 40 mph and 50 mph Speed Restriction) Order 2020 (S.S.I 2020 No. 265)
- The A78 Trunk Road (Branchton) (Temporary Prohibition of Specified Turns) (No. 2) Order 2020 (S.S.I 2020 No. 266)
- The Coronavirus (Scotland) Act 2020 (Suspension: Adults with Incapacity) Regulations 2020 (revoked) (S.S.I 2020 No. 267)
- The Homeless Persons (Unsuitable Accommodation) (Scotland) Amendment (Coronavirus) Order 2020 (revoked) (S.S.I 2020 No. 268)
- The Town and Country Planning (General Permitted Development) (Reverse Vending Machines) (Scotland) Amendment Order 2020 (S.S.I 2020 No. 269)
- The Coronavirus (Scotland) Act 2020 (Eviction from Dwelling-houses) (Notice Periods) Modification Regulations 2020 (S.S.I 2020 No. 270)
- The Health Protection (Coronavirus) (International Travel) (Scotland) Amendment (No. 12) Regulations 2020 (revoked) (S.S.I 2020 No. 271)
- The Scottish National Investment Bank Act 2020 (Commencement) Regulations 2020 (S.S.I 2020 No. 272 (C. 22))
- The A78 Trunk Road (Branchton) (Temporary Prohibition of Specified Turns) (No. 3) Order 2020 (S.S.I 2020 No. 273)
- The Health Protection (Coronavirus) (International Travel) (Scotland) Amendment (No. 13) Regulations 2020 (revoked) (S.S.I 2020 No. 274)
- The Building (Scotland) Amendment Regulations 2020 (S.S.I 2020 No. 275)
- The A1 Trunk Road (Lamberton) (Temporary Prohibition on Use of Road and Temporary Speed Restrictions) Order 2020 (S.S.I 2020 No. 276)
- The Valuation Timetable (Disposal of Appeals and Complaints) (Coronavirus) (Scotland) Amendment Order 2020 (S.S.I 2020 No. 277)
- The Scottish Elections (Reform) Act 2020 (Commencement No. 1) Regulations 2020 (S.S.I 2020 No. 278 (C. 23))
- The Health Protection (Coronavirus) (Restrictions and Requirements) (Scotland) Regulations 2020 (revoked) (S.S.I 2020 No. 279)
- The Health Protection (Coronavirus) (International Travel) (Scotland) Amendment (No. 14) Regulations 2020 (revoked) (S.S.I 2020 No. 280)
- The Climate Change (Duties of Public Bodies: Reporting Requirements) (Scotland) Amendment Order 2020 (S.S.I 2020 No. 281)
- The A85 Trunk Road (Gilmerton) (Temporary Prohibition of Use, Pedestrians and Waiting, Loading and Unloading) Order 2020 (S.S.I 2020 No. 282 )
- The Management of Offenders (Scotland) Act 2019 (Commencement No. 5 and Saving Provisions) Regulations 2020 (S.S.I 2020 No. 283 (C. 24))
- The Corporate Insolvency and Governance Act 2020 (Meetings of Scottish Charitable Incorporated Organisations) (Coronavirus) Regulations 2020 (S.S.I 2020 No. 284)
- The A82 Trunk Road (Glencoe) (Temporary Prohibition on Use of Road) Order 2020 (S.S.I 2020 No. 285)
- The Abertay University and Robert Gordon University (Change of Names) (Miscellaneous Amendments) (Scotland) Order 2020 (S.S.I 2020 No. 286)
- The Representation of the People (Electoral Registers Publication Date) (Coronavirus) (Scotland) Regulations 2020 (S.S.I 2020 No. 287)
- The Health Protection (Coronavirus) (International Travel) (Scotland) Amendment (No. 15) Regulations 2020 (revoked) (S.S.I 2020 No. 288)
- The North East Scotland Trunk Roads (Temporary Prohibitions of Traffic and Overtaking and Temporary Speed Restrictions) (No. 9) Order 2020 (S.S.I 2020 No. 289)
- The South East Scotland Trunk Roads (Temporary Prohibitions of Traffic and Overtaking and Temporary Speed Restrictions) (No. 9) Order 2020 (S.S.I 2020 No. 290)
- The South West Scotland Trunk Roads (Temporary Prohibitions of Traffic and Overtaking and Temporary Speed Restrictions) (No. 6) Order 2020 (S.S.I 2020 No. 291)
- The North West Scotland Trunk Roads (Temporary Prohibitions of Traffic and Overtaking and Temporary Speed Restrictions) (No. 9) Order 2020 (S.S.I 2020 No. 292)
- Act of Sederunt (Simple Procedure Amendment) (Civil Online) 2020 (revoked) (S.S.I 2020 No. 293)
- The Planning (Scotland) Act 2019 (Commencement No. 5 and Saving, Transitional and Consequential Provisions) Regulations 2020 (S.S.I 2020 No. 294 (C. 25))
- The Social Security (Scotland) Act 2018 (Commencement No. 8) Regulations 2020 (S.S.I 2020 No. 295 (C. 26))
- The Advice and Assistance (Assistance by Way of Representation) (Scotland) Amendment Regulations 2020 (S.S.I 2020 No. 296)
- The Scottish Elections (Details to appear on Election Material) Regulations 2020 (S.S.I 2020 No. 297)
- The Scottish Elections (Details to appear on Election Publications) Regulations 2020 (S.S.I 2020 No. 298)
- The Coronavirus (Scotland) Acts (Amendment of Expiry Dates) Regulations 2020 (revoked) (S.S.I 2020 No. 299)
- The Health Protection (Coronavirus) (Restrictions and Requirements) (Scotland) Amendment Regulations 2020 (revoked) (S.S.I 2020 No. 300)

== 301-393 ==
- The Health Protection (Coronavirus) (International Travel) (Scotland) Amendment (No. 16) Regulations 2020 (revoked) (S.S.I 2020 No. 301)
- The M8 (Newhouse to Easterhouse) M73 (Maryville to Mollinsburn) M74 (Daldowie to Hamilton) A8 (Newhouse to Bargeddie) A725 (Shawhead to Whistleberry) A7071 (Bellshill) Scotland Trunk Roads (Temporary Prohibitions of Traffic and Overtaking and Temporary Speed Restrictions) (No. 3) Order 2020 (S.S.I 2020 No. 302)
- The Glasgow School of Art Order of Council 2020 (S.S.I 2020 No. 303)
- The Rent Arrears Pre-Action Requirements (Coronavirus) (Scotland) Regulations 2020 (S.S.I 2020 No. 304)
- The Age of Criminal Responsibility (Scotland) Act 2019 (Independent Review of Disclosure of Information) Regulations 2020 (S.S.I 2020 No. 305)
- The Ardrossan Harbour Revision Order 2020 (S.S.I 2020 No. 306)
- The Health Protection (Coronavirus) (International Travel) (Scotland) Amendment (No. 17) Regulations 2020 (revoked) (S.S.I 2020 No. 307)
- The Electronic Monitoring (Approved Devices) (Scotland) Regulations 2020 (S.S.I 2020 No. 308)
- The Electronic Monitoring (Relevant Disposals) (Modification) (Scotland) Regulations 2020 (S.S.I 2020 No. 309)
- The Town and Country Planning, Management of Extractive Waste and Electricity Works (EU Exit) (Scotland) (Miscellaneous Amendments) Regulations 2020 (S.S.I 2020 No. 310)
- The Management of Offenders (Scotland) Act 2019 (Consequential Amendments) Regulations 2020 (S.S.I 2020 No. 311)
- The A85 Trunk Road (Methven) (Temporary Prohibition on Use, Waiting, Loading and Unloading) Order 2020 (S.S.I 2020 No. 312)
- The Equality Act 2010 (Specification of Public Authorities) (Scotland) Order 2020 (S.S.I 2020 No. 313)
- The Waste (Miscellaneous Amendments) (Scotland) Regulations 2020 (S.S.I 2020 No. 314)
- The Agriculture (Retained EU Law and Data) (Scotland) Act 2020 (Commencement No. 1) Regulations 2020 (S.S.I 2020 No. 315 (C. 27))
- The Marine Licensing (Exempted Activities) (Scottish Inshore Region) Amendment Order 2020 (S.S.I 2020 No. 316)
- The A82 and A828 Trunk Roads (North and South Ballachulish) (Temporary Prohibition on Use of Road) Order 2020 (S.S.I 2020 No. 317)
- The Health Protection (Coronavirus) (Restrictions and Requirements) (Additional Temporary Measures) (Scotland) Regulations 2020 (revoked) (S.S.I 2020 No. 318)
- The A82 Trunk Road (Drumnadrochit to Fort Augustus) (Temporary Prohibition on Use of Road) Order 2020 (S.S.I 2020 No. 319)
- The A85 Trunk Road (Comrie) (Temporary Prohibition on Use, Waiting, Loading and Unloading) Order 2020 (S.S.I 2020 No. 320)
- The Scottish Parliament (Disqualification) Order 2020 (S.S.I 2020 No. 321)
- The International Organisations (Immunities and Privileges) (Scotland) Amendment Order 2020 (S.S.I 2020 No. 322)
- Not Allocated (S.S.I 2020 No. 323)
- Not Allocated (S.S.I 2020 No. 324)
- The Health Protection (Coronavirus) (Restrictions and Requirements) (Additional Temporary Measures) (Scotland) Amendment Regulations 2020 (revoked) (S.S.I 2020 No. 325)
- The Health Protection (Coronavirus) (International Travel) (Scotland) Amendment (No. 18) Regulations 2020 (revoked) (S.S.I 2020 No. 326)
- The Non-Domestic Rates (Scotland) Act 2020 (Commencement No. 2, Transitional and Saving Provisions) Regulations 2020 (S.S.I 2020 No. 327 (C. 28))
- The Health Protection (Coronavirus, Public Health Information for Passengers Travelling to Scotland) Amendment Regulations 2020 (revoked) (S.S.I 2020 No. 328)
- The Health Protection (Coronavirus) (Restrictions and Requirements) (Additional Temporary Measures) (Scotland) Amendment (No. 2) Regulations 2020 (S.S.I 2020 No. 329)
- The Health Protection (Coronavirus) (International Travel) (Scotland) Amendment (No. 19) Regulations 2020 (revoked) (S.S.I 2020 No. 330)
- The M8 (Newhouse to Easterhouse) M73 (Maryville to Mollinsburn) M74 (Daldowie to Hamilton) A725 (Shawhead to Whistleberry) Scotland Trunk Roads (Temporary Prohibitions of Traffic and Overtaking and Temporary Speed Restrictions) (No. 4) Order 2020 (S.S.I 2020 No. 331)
- The North East Scotland Trunk Roads (Temporary Prohibitions of Traffic and Overtaking and Temporary Speed Restrictions) (No. 10) Order 2020 (S.S.I 2020 No. 332)
- The North West Scotland Trunk Roads (Temporary Prohibitions of Traffic and Overtaking and Temporary Speed Restrictions) (No. 10) Order 2020 (S.S.I 2020 No. 333)
- The South East Scotland Trunk Roads (Temporary Prohibitions of Traffic and Overtaking and Temporary Speed Restrictions) (No. 10) Order 2020 (S.S.I 2020 No. 334)
- The South West Scotland Trunk Roads (Temporary Prohibitions of Traffic and Overtaking and Temporary Speed Restrictions) (No. 7) Order 2020 (S.S.I 2020 No. 335)
- The A726 Trunk Road (College Milton) (Temporary 30 mph Speed Restriction) (No. 3) Order 2020 (S.S.I 2020 No. 336)
- The Insolvency (Amendment) (EU Exit) (Scotland) Regulations 2020 (S.S.I 2020 No. 337)
- The Insolvency Act 1986 (Scotland) Amendment Regulations 2020 (S.S.I 2020 No. 338)
- The Criminal Justice (EU Exit) (Scotland) (Amendment etc.) Regulations 2020 (S.S.I 2020 No. 339)
- The Social Security (Personal Independence Payment) Amendment (Scotland) Regulations 2020 (S.S.I 2020 No. 340)
- The Water and Sewerage Services Undertaking (Borrowing) (Scotland) Order 2020 (S.S.I 2020 No. 341)
- The M9/A9 Trunk Road (Thurso) (Temporary Prohibition on Use of Road) Order 2020 (S.S.I 2020 No. 342)
- The Health Protection (Coronavirus) (International Travel) (Scotland) Amendment (No. 20) Regulations 2020 (revoked) (S.S.I 2020 No. 343)
- The Health Protection (Coronavirus) (Restrictions and Requirements) (Local Levels) (Scotland) Regulations 2020 (revoked) (S.S.I 2020 No. 344)
- The A87 Trunk Road (Balmacara) (Temporary Prohibition on Use of Road) Order 2020 (S.S.I 2020 No. 345)
- The Islands (Scotland) Act 2018 (Commencement No. 3) Regulations 2020 (S.S.I 2020 No. 346 (C. 29))
- The Health Protection (Coronavirus) (Restrictions and Requirements) (Local Levels) (Scotland) Amendment Regulations 2020 (S.S.I 2020 No. 347)
- The Budget (Scotland) Act 2020 Amendment (No. 2) Regulations 2020 (S.S.I 2020 No. 348)
- The Common Agricultural Policy (Simplifications and Improvements) (Miscellaneous Amendments) (Scotland) Regulations 2020 (S.S.I 2020 No. 349)
- The Carer’s Allowance (Coronavirus) (Breaks in Care) (Scotland) Amendment Regulations 2020 (S.S.I 2020 No. 350)
- The Scottish Child Payment Regulations 2020 (S.S.I 2020 No. 351)
- The Winter Heating Assistance for Children and Young People (Scotland) Regulations 2020 (S.S.I 2020 No. 352)
- The First-tier Tribunal for Scotland Social Security Chamber (Procedure and Composition) Amendment Regulations 2020 (S.S.I 2020 No. 353)
- The Health Protection (Coronavirus) (International Travel) (Scotland) Amendment (No. 21) Regulations 2020 (revoked) (S.S.I 2020 No. 354)
- The A737/A738 Trunk Road (Improvements at Beith) (Trunking and Detrunking) Order 2020 (S.S.I 2020 No. 355)
- The A737/A738 Trunk Road (Improvements at Beith) (Side Roads) Order 2020 (S.S.I 2020 No. 356)
- The A737/A738 Trunk Road (Improvements at Beith) (Redetermination of Means of Exercise of Public Right of Passage) Order 2020 (S.S.I 2020 No. 357)
- The Health Protection (Coronavirus) (International Travel) (Scotland) Amendment (No. 22) Regulations 2020 (revoked) (S.S.I 2020 No. 358)
- The A78 Trunk Road (Gallowgate Street, Largs) (Temporary Prohibition on Waiting and Temporary Prohibition on Loading and Unloading) Order 2020 (S.S.I 2020 No. 359)
- The M77/A77 Trunk Road (Kirkoswald) (Temporary Prohibition on Use, Waiting, Loading and Unloading) Order 2020 (S.S.I 2020 No. 360)
- The Regulation of Investigatory Powers (Prescription of Offices, etc. and Specification of Public Authorities) (Scotland) Amendment Order 2020 (S.S.I 2020 No. 361)
- Not Allocated (S.S.I 2020 No. 362)
- Not Allocated (S.S.I 2020 No. 363)
- Act of Sederunt (Registration Appeal Court) 2020 (revoked) (S.S.I 2020 No. 364)
- The Management of Offenders etc. (Scotland) Act 2005 (Specification of Persons) Amendment Order 2020 (S.S.I 2020 No. 365)
- The Town and Country Planning (General Permitted Development) (Coronavirus) (Scotland) Amendment (No. 2) Order 2020 (S.S.I 2020 No. 366)
- The Fisheries (Technical Conservation Measures) (EU Exit) (Scotland) (Amendment etc.) Regulations 2020 (S.S.I 2020 No. 367)
- The Agriculture (EU Exit) (Scotland) (Amendment) Regulations 2020 (S.S.I 2020 No. 368)
- The Age of Criminal Responsibility (Scotland) Act 2019 (Commencement No. 3) Regulations 2020 (S.S.I 2020 No. 369 (C. 30))
- The Children’s Hearings (Scotland) Act 2011 (Children’s Advocacy Services) Regulations 2020 (S.S.I 2020 No. 370)
- The Reciprocal Enforcement of Foreign Judgments (Norway) Amendment (Scotland) Order 2020 (S.S.I 2020 No. 371)
- The Food and Feed (EU Exit) (Scotland) (Amendment) Regulations 2020 (S.S.I 2020 No. 372)
- The Agriculture (Retained EU Law and Data) (Scotland) Act 2020 (Commencement No. 2) Regulations 2020 (S.S.I 2020 No. 373 (C. 31))
- The Health Protection (Coronavirus) (Restrictions and Requirements) (Local Levels) (Scotland) Amendment (No. 2) Regulations 2020 (S.S.I 2020 No. 374)
- The Scottish Parliament (Constituencies and Regions) Order 2020 (S.S.I 2020 No. 375)
- The Police Act 1997 and the Protection of Vulnerable Groups (Scotland) Act 2007 (Fees) (Coronavirus) (Amendment) Regulations 2020 (S.S.I 2020 No. 376)
- The Coronavirus Act 2020 (Suspension: Adult Social Care) (Scotland) Regulations 2020 (S.S.I 2020 No. 377)
- The Health Protection (Coronavirus) (International Travel) (Scotland) Amendment (No. 23) Regulations 2020 (revoked) (S.S.I 2020 No. 378)
- The Animals and Wildlife (Penalties, Protections and Powers) (Scotland) Act 2020 (Commencement No. 1 and Transitional Provision) Regulations 2020 (S.S.I 2020 No. 379 (C. 32))
- The Animal Health and Welfare and Official Controls (Agriculture) (EU Exit) (Scotland) (Amendment) Regulations 2020 (S.S.I 2020 No. 380)
- The Genetically Modified Organisms and Pesticides (EU Exit) (Scotland) (Amendment etc.) Regulations 2020 (S.S.I 2020 No. 381)
- The Valuation Appeal Committee (Procedure in Civil Penalty Appeals) (Scotland) Regulations 2020 (S.S.I 2020 No. 382)
- The Land Reform (Scotland) Act 2016 (Commencement No. 11) Regulations 2020 (S.S.I 2020 No. 383 (C. 33))
- The Mandatory Use of Closed Circuit Television in Slaughterhouses (Scotland) Regulations 2020 (S.S.I 2020 No. 384)
- The Welfare of Farmed Animals (Scotland) Amendment Regulations 2020 (S.S.I 2020 No. 385)
- The Criminal Justice and Data Protection (Protocol No. 36) Amendment (Scotland) Regulations 2020 (S.S.I 2020 No. 386)
- The Producer Responsibility Obligations (Packaging Waste) Amendment (Scotland) Regulations 2020 (S.S.I 2020 No. 387)
- The Human Tissue (Excepted Body Parts) (Scotland) Regulations 2020 (S.S.I 2020 No. 388)
- The Health Protection (Coronavirus) (Restrictions and Requirements) (Local Levels) (Scotland) Amendment (No. 3) Regulations 2020 (S.S.I 2020 No. 389)
- The M8 (Newhouse to Easterhouse), M73 (Maryville to Mollinsburn), A8 (Newhouse to Bargeddie) and A725 (Shawhead to Whistleberry) Trunk Roads (Temporary Prohibitions of Traffic and Overtaking and Temporary Speed Restrictions) (No. 4) Order 2020 (S.S.I 2020 No. 390)
- The Non-Domestic Rates (Restriction of Relief and Consequential Amendments) (Scotland) Regulations 2020 (S.S.I 2020 No. 391)
- The Health Protection (Coronavirus) (Restrictions and Requirements) (Local Levels) (Scotland) Amendment (No. 4) Regulations 2020 (S.S.I 2020 No. 392)
- The Aquaculture and Fisheries (EU Exit) (Scotland) (Amendment etc.) Regulations 2020 (S.S.I 2020 No. 393)
- The M74/A74 Trunk Road (Carmyle to Daldowie) (Temporary 50 mph Speed Restriction) Order 2020 (S.S.I 2020 No. 394)
- The North West Scotland Trunk Roads (Temporary Prohibitions of Traffic and Overtaking and Temporary Speed Restrictions) (No. 11) Order 2020 (S.S.I 2020 No. 395)
- The North East Scotland Trunk Roads (Temporary Prohibitions of Traffic and Overtaking and Temporary Speed Restrictions) (No. 11) Order 2020 (S.S.I 2020 No. 396)
- The South East Scotland Trunk Roads (Temporary Prohibitions of Traffic and Overtaking and Temporary Speed Restrictions) (No. 11) Order 2020 (S.S.I 2020 No. 397)
- The Official Feed and Food Controls (Miscellaneous Amendments) (Scotland) Regulations 2020 (S.S.I 2020 No. 398)
- The Social Security Co-ordination (EU Exit) (Scotland) (Amendments etc.) Regulations 2020 (S.S.I 2020 No. 399)
- The Health Protection (Coronavirus) (Restrictions and Requirements) (Local Levels) (Scotland) Amendment (No. 5) Regulations 2020 (S.S.I 2020 No. 400)

== 400-478 ==
- The Scottish National Investment Bank p.l.c. (Miscellaneous Listings) Order 2020 (S.S.I 2020 No. 401)
- The Companies Act 2006 (Scottish public sector companies to be audited by the Auditor General for Scotland) Order 2020 (S.S.I 2020 No. 402)
- The Scottish National Investment Bank p.l.c. and South of Scotland Enterprise (Miscellaneous Listings) Regulations 2020 (S.S.I 2020 No. 403)
- The Health Protection (Coronavirus) (International Travel) (Scotland) Amendment (No. 24) Regulations 2020 (revoked) (S.S.I 2020 No. 404)
- The Victims and Witnesses (Scotland) Act 2014 (Commencement No. 7 and Transitional Provisions) Order 2020 (S.S.I 2020 No. 405 (C. 34))
- The Enforcement of Fines (Relevant Penalty) (Scotland) Order 2020 (S.S.I 2020 No. 406)
- The Serious Crime Act 2015 (Commencement No. 3) (Scotland) Regulations 2020 (S.S.I 2020 No. 407 (C. 35))
- The Public Health etc. (Scotland) Act 2008 (Notifiable Organisms) Amendment Regulations 2020 (S.S.I 2020 No. 408)
- The Financial Assistance for Environmental Purposes (Scotland) Order 2020 (S.S.I 2020 No. 409)
- The Offensive Weapons Act 2019 (Commencement No. 1) (Scotland) Regulations 2020 (S.S.I 2020 No. 410 (C. 36) )
- Not Allocated (S.S.I 2020 No. 411)
- The Children (Scotland) Act 2020 (Commencement No. 1 and Saving Provisions) Regulations 2020 (S.S.I 2020 No. 412 (C. 37))
- The Council Tax Reduction (Scotland) Amendment (No. 4) Regulations 2020 (S.S.I 2020 No. 413)
- The Civil Partnership (Scotland) Act 2020 (Commencement No. 1 and Interim Recognition of Different Sex Relationships) Regulations 2020 (S.S.I 2020 No. 414 (C. 38))
- The Health Protection (Coronavirus) (Restrictions and Requirements) (Local Levels) (Scotland) Amendment (No. 6) Regulations 2020 (S.S.I 2020 No. 415)
- The Conservation of Salmon (Scotland) Amendment Regulations 2020 (S.S.I 2020 No. 416)
- The Spring Traps Approval (Scotland) Amendment Order 2020 (S.S.I 2020 No. 417)
- The Valuation (Postponement of Revaluation) (Coronavirus) (Scotland) Order 2020 (S.S.I 2020 No. 418)
- The Homeless Persons (Unsuitable Accommodation) (Scotland) Amendment (No. 2) Order 2020 (S.S.I 2020 No. 419)
- The National Health Service (Pharmaceutical Services) (Scotland) Amendment Regulations 2020 (S.S.I 2020 No. 420)
- The Corporate Insolvency and Governance Act 2020 (Meetings of Scottish Charitable Incorporated Organisations) (Coronavirus) (No. 2) Regulations 2020 (S.S.I 2020 No. 421)
- The Social Security Administration and Tribunal Membership (Scotland) Act 2020 (Commencement No. 1) Regulations 2020 (S.S.I 2020 No. 422 (C. 39))
- Act of Sederunt (Fees of Messengers-at-Arms and Sheriff Officers) (Hague Service Convention) (Amendment) 2020 (S.S.I 2020 No. 423)
- The Legal Aid and Advice and Assistance (Miscellaneous Amendments) (Scotland) Regulations 2020 (S.S.I 2020 No. 424)
- The Health Protection (Coronavirus) (Protection from Eviction) (Scotland) Regulations 2020 (revoked) (S.S.I 2020 No. 425)
- The Scottish Parliament (Elections etc.) (Miscellaneous Amendments) Order 2020 (S.S.I 2020 No. 426)
- The Health Protection (Coronavirus) (Restrictions and Requirements) (Local Levels) (Scotland) Amendment (No. 7) Regulations 2020 (S.S.I 2020 No. 427)
- The Land Reform (Scotland) Act 2016 (Commencement No. 12) Regulations 2020 (S.S.I 2020 No. 428 (C. 40))
- The Transport (Scotland) Act 2019 (Commencement No. 3) Regulations 2020 (S.S.I 2020 No. 429 (C. 41))
- The Agricultural Holdings (Relinquishment and Assignation) (Scotland) Regulations 2020 (S.S.I 2020 No. 430)
- The Health Protection (Coronavirus) (International Travel and Public Health Information) (Scotland) Regulations 2020 (revoked) (S.S.I 2020 No. 431)
- The A702 Trunk Road (Flotterstone) (Temporary Clearway) Order 2020 (S.S.I 2020 No. 432)
- The Lands Tribunal for Scotland (Miscellaneous Amendments) Rules 2020 (S.S.I 2020 No. 433)
- The Environmental Protection (Disposal of Polychlorinated Biphenyls and other Dangerous Substances) (Scotland) Amendment Regulations 2020 (S.S.I 2020 No. 434)
- The Charities (Disclosure of Information to Designated Bodies) (Scotland) Order 2020 (S.S.I 2020 No. 435)
- The Census (Scotland) Amendment Order 2020 (S.S.I 2020 No. 436)
- The Town and Country Planning (General Permitted Development and Use Classes) (Scotland) Amendment Order 2020 (S.S.I 2020 No. 437)
- The A9 and A96 Trunk Roads (Raigmore Interchange) (Temporary 30 mph Speed Restriction) Order 2020 (S.S.I 2020 No. 438)
- The Health Protection (Coronavirus) (Restrictions and Requirements) (Miscellaneous Amendments) (Scotland) Regulations 2020 (S.S.I 2020 No. 439)
- Act of Sederunt (Rules of the Court of Session 1994 and Sheriff Court Rules Amendment) (Miscellaneous) (No. 2) 2020 (S.S.I 2020 No. 440)
- The Civil and Family Justice (EU Exit) (Scotland) (Amendment etc.) Regulations 2020 (S.S.I 2020 No. 441)
- The M8 (Newhouse to Easterhouse) M73 (Maryville to Mollinsburn) M74 (Daldowie to Hamilton) A8 (Newhouse to Bargeddie) A725 (Shawhead to Whistleberry) A7071 (Bellshill) Trunk Roads (Temporary Prohibitions of Traffic and Overtaking and Temporary Speed Restrictions) (No. 4) Order 2020 (S.S.I 2020 No. 442)
- The UEFA European Championship (Trading and Advertising) (Scotland) Regulations 2020 (S.S.I 2020 No. 443)
- The Health Protection (Coronavirus) (International Travel and Public Health Information) (Scotland) (No. 2) Regulations 2020 (revoked) (S.S.I 2020 No. 444)
- The Seed, Plant Propagating Material and Forest Reproductive Material (EU Exit) (Scotland) (Amendment etc.) Regulations 2020 (S.S.I 2020 No. 445)
- The Lands Tribunal for Scotland (Amendment) (Fees) (No. 2) Rules 2020 (S.S.I 2020 No. 446)
- The Fish Farming Businesses (Reporting) (Scotland) Order 2020 (S.S.I 2020 No. 447)
- The Community Empowerment (Scotland) Act 2015 (Commencement No. 12 and Saving Provision) Order 2020 (S.S.I 2020 No. 448 (C. 42))
- The Children’s Hearings (Provision of Information by Principal Reporter) (Specified Persons) (Scotland) Regulations 2020 (S.S.I 2020 No. 449)
- The Census (Scotland) Amendment Regulations 2020 (S.S.I 2020 No. 450)
- The Crofting Community Right to Buy (Procedure, Ballots and Forms) (Scotland) Regulations 2020 (S.S.I 2020 No. 451)
- The Health Protection (Coronavirus) (Restrictions and Requirements) (Local Levels) (Scotland) Amendment (No. 8) Regulations 2020 (S.S.I 2020 No. 452)
- The Police Service of Scotland (Miscellaneous Amendments) Regulations 2020 (S.S.I 2020 No. 453)
- The Police Appeals Tribunals (Scotland) Amendment Rules 2020 (S.S.I 2020 No. 454)
- The Animals, Food and Feed (EU Exit) (Scotland) (Amendment) Regulations 2020 (S.S.I 2020 No. 455)
- The Common Agricultural Policy (Less Favoured Area Support) (EU Exit) (Scotland) Amendment Regulations 2020 (S.S.I 2020 No. 456)
- The Civil Partnership (Scotland) Act 2020 (Commencement No. 2) Regulations 2020 (S.S.I 2020 No. 457 (C. 43))
- The Trade in Animals and Related Products (EU Exit) (Scotland) (Amendment) Regulations 2020 (S.S.I 2020 No. 458)
- The South West Scotland Trunk Roads (Temporary Prohibitions of Traffic and Overtaking and Temporary Speed Restrictions) (No. 8) Order 2020 (S.S.I 2020 No. 459)
- The Direct Payments to Farmers (Miscellaneous Amendments) (Scotland) Regulations 2020 (S.S.I 2020 No. 460)
- The North East Scotland Trunk Roads (Temporary Prohibitions of Traffic and Overtaking and Temporary Speed Restrictions) (No. 12) Order 2020 (S.S.I 2020 No. 461)
- The South East Scotland Trunk Roads (Temporary Prohibitions of Traffic and Overtaking and Temporary Speed Restrictions) (No. 12) Order 2020 (S.S.I 2020 No. 462)
- The North West Scotland Trunk Roads (Temporary Prohibitions of Traffic and Overtaking and Temporary Speed Restrictions) (No. 12) Order 2020 (S.S.I 2020 No. 463)
- The Animal Health and Welfare (Scotland) Act 2006 (Commencement No. 3 and Saving Provisions) Order 2020 (S.S.I 2020 No. 464 (C. 44))
- The Island Communities Impact Assessments (Publication and Review of Decisions) (Scotland) Regulations 2020 (S.S.I 2020 No. 465)
- The Plant Health (EU Exit) (Scotland) (Amendment etc.) Regulations 2020 (S.S.I 2020 No. 466)
- The Feed (Transfer of Functions) (Miscellaneous Amendments) (Scotland) Regulations 2020 (S.S.I 2020 No. 467)
- The Public Procurement etc. (EU Exit) (Scotland) (Amendment) Regulations 2020 (S.S.I 2020 No. 468)
- The Social Care Staff Support Fund (Coronavirus) (Scotland) Amendment Regulations 2020 (S.S.I 2020 No. 469)
- Act of Adjournal (Challenges to Validity of EU Instruments (EU Exit)) (Amendment) 2020 (S.S.I 2020 No. 470)
- The Health Protection (Coronavirus) (Restrictions and Requirements) (Local Levels) (Scotland) Amendment (No. 9) Regulations 2020 (S.S.I 2020 No. 471)
- Act of Sederunt (Challenges to Validity of EU Instruments (EU Exit)) (Amendment) 2020 (S.S.I 2020 No. 472)
- The Invasive Non-native Species (EU Exit) (Scotland) (Amendment etc.) Regulations 2020 (S.S.I 2020 No. 473)
- The Health Protection (Coronavirus) (International Travel) (Scotland) Amendment (No. 25) Regulations 2020 (revoked) (S.S.I 2020 No. 474)
- The Carer’s Allowance Supplement and Young Carer Grants (Residence Requirements and Procedural Provisions) (EU Exit) (Scotland) Regulations 2020 (S.S.I 2020 No. 475)
- The First-tier Tribunal for Scotland Social Security Chamber and Upper Tribunal for Scotland (Allocation of Functions, Procedure and Composition) (Miscellaneous Amendments) Regulations 2020 (S.S.I 2020 No. 476)
- The Rural Development (EU Exit) (Scotland) (Amendment) Regulations 2020 (S.S.I 2020 No. 477)
- The Cross-border Health Care (EU Exit) (Scotland) (Amendment) Regulations 2020 (S.S.I 2020 No. 478)
