= Stephen John Watson =

British agriculturalist

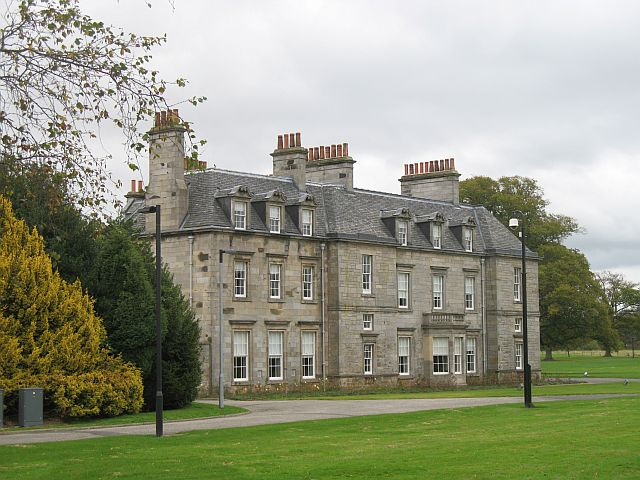
Bush House

Stephen John Watson FRSE FRIC FRAgS CBE (24 March 1898 – 25 June 1976) was a 20th-century British agriculturalist. He had an expert knowledge of the nutritional values of hay, straw and silage under different conditions.

In 1947 he founded the Edinburgh Centre of Rural Economy (ECRE) at Bush House, near Penicuik.

== Life ==
Watson was born on 24 March 1898 in Chanchamayo, Peru, the son of William Watson, an accountant. He was educated in Lima.

In 1910 the family returned to Newcastle-upon-Tyne where he completed his education at Tynemouth School. He then studied science at the University of Newcastle.

His studies were interrupted by the First World War, during which he was in the Scottish Horse Regiment, then in the King Edward's Horse Regiment. Returning to University after the war, he graduated with a BSc in 1920.

In 1936 he became head of Biochemistry and Nutrition at ICI Research Laboratories at Jealott's Hill. In 1944 he was appointed Professor of Agriculture at the University of Edinburgh, succeeding Ernest Shearer. This role also included being Principal of the East of Scotland College of Agriculture.

In 1945 he was elected a Fellow of the Royal Society of Edinburgh. His proposers were James Pickering Kendall, Alexander McCall Smith, Edward Wyllie Fenton and Alfred Cameron.

He died at Havant in Hampshire on 25 June 1976.

== Publications ==
- The Digestibility and Feeding Value of Greg Meal (1931)
- The Nutritive Value of Grass and its By Products (1932)
- The Vitamin A and Carotene Content of Butter (1932)
- The Value of Grass Silage (1932)
- A New Alternative to Hay (1933)
- The Conservation of Grassland Herbage (1934)
- The Chemical Composition of Grass Silage (1937)
- Digestibility of Straw (1939)
- Increasing the Feeding Value of Cereal Straws (1941)
- The Teart Pastures of Somerset (1943)
- The Composition and Nutritive Value of Seed Hays (1944)
