= List of conversion units of the Royal Air Force =

Ensign of the Royal Air Force

Conversion units and operational conversion units (OCUs) were training units of the Royal Air Force (RAF).

== History ==
With the introduction of new heavy bombers, the four-engined Short Stirling, Avro Lancaster, and Handley Page Halifax, the Royal Air Force introduced heavy conversion units (HCU). These HCUs began forming in late 1941, to qualify crews trained on medium bombers to operate the heavy bombers before final posting to the operational squadrons. Some of the HCUs were involved in bombing operations over Germany.

After the end of the Second World War, the role of the HCUs was taken over by the operational conversion units (OCUs). Although the units had nominal bases, different flights and individual aircraft usually were detached nearer the operational bases.

RAF OCUs are training units that prepare aircrew for operations on a particular type or types of aircraft or roles. Some OCUs have a shadow, or reserve, squadron designation, which is used if the unit has a war role.

== Current RAF OCUs ==
F-35 Lightning – RAF Marham

- 207 Squadron

Typhoon – RAF Coningsby

- 29 Squadron

Support helicopter (Puma and Chinook) – RAF Benson

- 28 Squadron

Air Mobility (Atlas and C-17) – RAF Brize Norton

- 24 Squadron

ISR (Wedgetail, Poseidon) – RAF Lossiemouth

- 42 Squadron

ISR (Reaper, Protector, Rivet Joint and Shadow) – RAF Waddington

- 54 Squadron

Some aircraft types operated by a single squadron, which includes most transport aircraft, and most ISTAR aircraft, are not big enough to need a dedicated OCU squadron for their training requirements; they may only have a few at any time. Therefore, smaller squadrons also incorporate training facilities to allow them to process aircrew onto their aircraft type. Some roles, such as ISTAR, require more rear crew for the aircraft, such as weapon systems officers (WSOs) and weapon systems operators (WSOps) – their training can be more generalised, and this is carried out by 54 Squadron at RAF Waddington. This reduces the training requirement on the individual ISTAR squadrons, by providing aircrew who require only aircraft conversion training when they reach their squadrons.

Pilots are trained directly onto their aircraft type by the frontline squadrons using training "flights". An example of this is the OCU flight of 24 Squadron, which trains new Atlas and C-17 aircrew onto the aircraft.

OCUs are monitored by the RAF's Central Flying School to maintain training standards. Training is delivered by qualified flying instructors (QFIs) and qualified weapons instructors, and frontline squadrons also have qualified individuals to deliver continual and refresher training after the OCU. OCUs generally also provide training for those aircrew selected to become QFIs on an aircraft type – an example would be the now disbanded 208(R) Squadron, which previously trained aircrew for the now disbanded 100 Squadron, QFIs for 208(R), and provided refresher training for aircrew joining the RAF aerobatic team, the Red Arrows, on the Hawk T.1.

== List of conversion units ==
Unit	Dates	Aircraft	Base	Notes
226 OCU	Aug 46–Aug 49; Sep 49–Jun 55; Jun 63–Sep 74; Oct 74–Sep 91	Oxford I, Beaufighter X Hornet F.1; Mosquito III/TT.35; Tiger Moth II; Vampire F.1/FB.5/T.11; Meteor F.3/F.4/T.7/F.8/FR.9; Tempest II; Martinet I Spitfire XIV/XVI/XVIII/XIX/F.22; Javelin T.3; Lightning F.1/F.1A/F.3/T.4/T.5; Jaguar GR.1/T.2	RAF Molesworth; RAF Bentwaters; RAF Driffield; RAF Stradishall; RAF Middleton St. George; RAF Coltishall; RAF Lossiemouth	Formed at Molesworth by re-designating 1335 (Meteor) CU. Disbanded at Driffield to become 203 AFS. Re-formed at Stradishall by renaming 203 AFS. Re-formed at Middleton St. George by merging the Lightning Conversion Squadron RAF and the Fighter Command Instrument Rating Squadron RAF. Disbanded at Coltishall. Immediately re-formed at Lossiemouth by re-designating the Jaguar Operational Conversion Unit RAF. Disbanded at Lossiemouth to become 16 (Reserve) Sqn
227 OCU; 227 (AOP) CU	May 47–Dec 47; Dec 47–May 50	Tiger Moth II; Oxford I Auster V Auster VI; Auster T.7; Auster A.2/45; Harvard IIB	RAF Andover; RAF Middle Wallop	Formed by re-designation of No. 43 OTU; Became the Air Observation Post School RAF.
228 OCU	May 47–Sep 61; May 65–Dec 66; Aug 68–Jul 92	Martinet I Master II; Oxford I Tiger Moth II; Brigand B.1/T.4/T.5; Tempest V Buckmaster T.1; Wellington XVIII; Mosquito III/VI/NF.30/TT.35/NF.36; Balliol T.2; Valetta C.1/T.3/T.4; Prentice T.1; Vampire T.11; Meteor F.4/T.7/NF.11/NF.12/NF.14; Anson XIX; Chipmunk T.10; Javelin T.3/FAW.5/FAW.7/FAW.9; Canberra T.4/T.11; Phantom FGR.2; Jet Provost T.4	RAF Leeming; RAF Leuchars; RAF Coningsby	Formed by merging No. 13 OTU and No. 54 OTU; Became 64 (R) Sqn
229 OCU	Dec 50–Sep 74; Nov 84–Jul 92	Vampire FB.5/T.11; Meteor T.7/F.8/TT.8; Hunter F.1/F.4/F.6/T.7/FGA.9/FR.10; Tempest V Beaufighter X Oxford I/II; Mosquito III/TT.35; Martinet I Anson T.21/T.22; Sabre F.2/F.4; Chipmunk T.10; Jet Provost T.3A; Tornado F.2(T)/F.3	RAF Leuchars; RAF Chivenor; RAF Brawdy; RAF Coningsby	Formed from 'B' and 'D' Flights of 226 OCU. Reformed 1957 at Chivenor; Disbanded 2 September 1974 at Chivenor when relocated to Brawdy to become the Tactical Weapons Unit RAF; Reformed at Coningsby in 1984 and designated 65 (Shadow) Squadron from 31 December 1986; Became 56 (R) Sqn.
230 OCU	Mar 47–Oct 52; Aug 53–Feb 55; May 56–Aug 81	Lancaster I/III; Lincoln B.2; Mosquito III/B.35/NF.36; Tiger Moth; Anson XIX; Vulcan B.1/B.2; Hastings T.5; Canberra T.4	RAF Lindholme; RAF Scampton; RAF Upwood; RAF Waddington; RAF Finningley; RAF Scampton	Formed by re-designting No. 1653 Heavy Conversion Unit RAF; Disbanded 15 October 1952 to become the Reserve Training Squadron RAF; Became the Lincoln Conversion Flight RAF at Upwood 1 February 1955.
231 OCU	Mar 47–Dec 49; Dec 51–Dec 90; May 1991–Apr 93	Lancaster I/III; Anson XII/XIX/T.22; Mosquito III/VI/XVI/PR.34/PR.34A/B.35; Chipmunk T.10; Meteor T.7/PR.10; Canberra B.2/PR.3/T.4	RAF Coningsby; RAF Waddington; RAF Bassingbourn; RAF Cottesmore; RAF Marham; RAF Wyton	Formed by re-designating No. 16 Operational Training Unit RAF re-formed at Bassingbourn by re-designation of 237 OCU; Disbanded at Wyton, 15 December 1990, to become the Canberra Standardisation and Training Flight; Re-formed at Wyton 13 May 1990 from the Canberra Standardisation and Training Flight
232 OCU	Feb 55–Jun 65; Feb 70–Apr 86	Valiant B.1; Victor B.1/B.1A/B.2/SR.2/K.2; Canberra T.4	RAF Gaydon; RAF Marham	At Gaydon, 30 June 1965, the Victor element became the Tanker Training Flight RAF; Re-formed at Marham 6 February 1970 by amalgamating the Victor (B.2) Training Flight RAF and the Victor Training Unit RAF.
233 OCU	Sep 52–Sep 57; Oct 70–Sep 92	Vampire FB.5/FB.9/T.11; Balliol T.2; Meteor T.7/F.8; Oxford I Tiger Moth II; Mosquito III/PR.34A/TT.35; Tempest V Chipmunk T.10; Hunter F.1; Harrier GR.1/GR.1A/GR.3/GR.3A; Harrier T.2/T.4/T.4A/GR.5	RAF Pembrey; RAF Wittering	Became 20 (R) Sqn
235 OCU	Jul 47–Oct 53	Sunderland V Short Seaford	RAF Calshot	Became the Flying Boat Training Squadron RAF
236 OCU	Jul 47–Sep 56; Jul 70–Sep 92	Lancaster III; Oxford I/II; Beaufighter X Shackleton GR.1/MR.1A; Neptune MR.1; Martinet I Tiger Moth II; Spitfire XVI; Vampire FB.5; Anson XI/XIX; Mosquito TT.35; Brigand T.5; Buckmaster T.1; Nimrod MR1 & MR2	RAF Kinloss; RAF St Mawgan	Formed by re-designating No. 6 OTU
237 OCU	Jul 47–Dec 51; Oct 56–Jan 58; Mar 71–Oct 91	Oxford I Mosquito III/PR.34/PR.34A; Spitfire XVI/XIX; Harvard IIB; Meteor T.7/PR.10; Canberra PR.3/T.4; Hunter F.6/T.7/T.7A/T.7B/T.8C; Buccaneer S.2A/S.2B	RAF Benson; RAF Bassingbourn; RAF Wyton; RAF Honington; RAF Lossiemouth	Formed by re-designating No. 8 OTU; Became 231 OCU at Bassingbourn. Re-formed at Wyton, 1956, by re-designating 'C' Squadron of 231 OCU. Re-absorbed by 231 OCU January 1958.
238 OCU	1 Jun 52–Mar 58	Buckmaster T.1; Brigand T.4/T.5; Mosquito TT.35; Balliol T.2; Meteor NF.12/NF.14; Valetta C.1/T.3	RAF Colerne; RAF North Luffenham	Formed by re-designating the Airborne Interception School RAF
240 OCU	Jan 48–Apr 51; Dec 71–Oct 93	Anson I/X/XII/XIX; Dakota IV; Hastings MET.1; Valetta C.1; Wessex HC.2; Puma HC.1; Chinook HC.1	RAF North Luffenham; RAF Odiham	Formed by merging 1333 (TS)CU with 1382 (T)CU
241 OCU	Jan 48–Apr 51; Jul 70–Oct 93	York C.1; Halifax IX; Hastings C.1; Valetta C.1; Tiger Moth II; Anson XI/XII; Brittania C.1/C.2; Andover C.1; Belfast C.1; VC10 C.1; Tristar C.1; BAe 146	RAF Dishforth; RAF Brize Norton	Formed by re-designating No. 1332 Heavy Transport Conversion Unit RAF; Became No. 55 (Reserve) Squadron RAF
242 OCU	Apr 51–Jul 92	Valetta C.1; Hastings C.1/MET.1/C.1A; Beverley C.1; Argosy C.1; Andover C.1; Hercules C.1/C.1K/C.1P/C.3; Tiger Moth II; Anson XII; Chipmunk T.10	RAF Dishforth; RAF Thorney Island; RAF Lyneham	Became 57 (R) Sqn
1330 CU	Jun 44–Mar 46	Harvard IIA; Baltimore IV/V; Vengeance IV; Hudson IIIA; Expeditor I Marauder II/III; Ventura V Hellcat II; Beaufighter X Spitfire Vb; Mustang IVA; Anson I Dakota I/III; Douglas DC-2; Mosquito III/IV; Oxford I	RAF Bilbeis	No. 1 (Middle East) Check and Conversion Unit RAF re-designated.
1331 CU; 1331 HTCU	Sep 44–Jan 46; Dec 46–Jan 48	Harvard IIB; Vengeance IA/II/IV; Beaufighter VI/X; Spitfire VIII; Mustang IV; Mosquito III; Oxford I Blenheim V Thunderbolt I/II; Hurricane IIC; Wellington XVI; Liberator III/VI	RAF Mauripur; RAF Risalpur; RAF Syerston	Formed by re-designating Check and Conversion Flight RAF.
1332 (T)HCU; 1332 HTCU	Sep 44–May 47; May 47–Jan 48	Liberator III/V /VI/VII/IX; York C.1; Stirling III; Halifax VII/IX; Skymaster C.1; Oxford I	RAF Longtown; RAF Dishforth	Became 241 OCU.
1333 (TS)CU; 1333 TSCU	Mar 45–Jul 46; Jul 46–Jan 48	Dakota III/IV; Horsa I/II; Halifax VII/IX; Oxford II; Miles Magister; Tiger Moth; Proctor IV; Auster III	RAF Leicester East; RAF North Luffenham	Formed by re-designating No. 107 OTU; Merged with 1382 (T)CU to become 240 OCU.
1334 (TS)CU	Apr 45–Mar 45	Dakota III/IV	RAF Gujrat; RAF Baroda	
1335 (M)CU	Mar 45–Aug 46	Meteor F.1/F.3; Oxford II; Martinet I	RAF Colerne; RAF Molesworth	Became 226 OCU
1336 (TS)CU; 1336 TCU	Jun 45–Mar 46	Dakota III	RAF Welford	
1380 (TS)CU; 1380 TCU	Aug 45–Jan 46	Wellington X Anson I Proctor II	RAF Tilstock	Formed by re-designating No. 81 OTU
1381 (T)CU	Aug 45–Feb 48	Dakota III/IV; Vickers Wellington Mk. X Miles Magister; Tiger Moth II; Oxford I	RAF Bramcote; RAF Dishforth	Formed by re-designating No. 105 (Transport) Operational Training Unit at Bramcote.
1382 (T)CU	Aug 45–Jan 48	Oxford I Miles Magister; Dakota III/IV	RAF Wymeswold; RAF North Luffenham	Formed by re-designating No. 108 OTU; Merged with 1330 (TS)CU to form 240 OCU.
1383 (T)CU	Aug 45–Aug 46	Dakota III; Oxford II; Halifax VII	RAF Crosby-on-Eden	Formed by re-designating No. 109 OTU
1384 (HT)CU	Nov 45–Jun 46	Dakota I Oxford I York C.1	RAF Ossington; RAF Wethersfield	Formed by re-designating No. 6 Lancaster Finishing School RAF
1385 (HTS)CU	Apr 46–Jun 46	Stirling V Halifax VII; Horsa II; Oxford I	RAF Wethersfield	Absorbed by 1333 (TS)CU
1584 (HB)CU	Nov 43–Feb 44	Liberator III	RAF Kolar; RAF Salbani	Formed by re-designating No. 1584 (Heavy Bomber Conversion) Flight RAF. Became 1673 HCU.
1651 CU; 1651 HCU	Jan 42–July 44; May 44–Mar 45; Mar 45–Jul 45	Stirling I/III; Lancaster I/III; Oxford I Spitfire Vb; Tiger Moth II; Beaufighter X Halifax II	RAF Waterbeach; RAF Wratting Common; RAF Woolfox Lodge	During 1942 it flew 49 operational sorties for RAF Bomber Command with a loss of five aircraft. Formed by merging No. 26 Conversion Flight RAF and No. 106 Conversion Flight RAF. Absorbed No. 15 Squadron Conversion Flight RAF and No. 24 Squadron Conversion Flight RAF.
1652 CU; 1652 HCU	Jan 42–Jun 45	Halifax I/II/III/V; Spitfire Vb; Hurricane IIC; Spitfire Vb; Hurricane IIC/IV	RAF Marston Moor; RAF Bentwaters	During 1942 it flew 42 operational sorties for RAF Bomber Command with a loss of three aircraft. Formed by merging No. 28 Conversion Flight RAF and No. 109 Conversion Flight RAF. Absorbed No. 35 Squadron Conversion Flight RAF
1653 CU; 1653 HCU	Jan 42–Oct 42; Nov 43–Nov 46	Liberator II; Stirling I/III; Lancaster I/III; Blenheim IV; Ventura I Mosquito XIX; Hurricane IIC; Spitfire Vb; Beaufighter VI	RAF Polebrook; RAF Burn; RAF Chedburgh; RAF Lindholme; RAF North Luffenham	Formed by re-designating No. 108 Conversion Flight RAF; Became No. 230 Operational Conversion Unit RAF in March 1947.
1654 CU; 1654 HCU	May 42–Jul 42; Jul 42–Sep 45	Manchester I Lancaster I Halifax II/V; Stirling III; Oxford I Hurricane IIC; Spitfire Vb	RAF Swinderby; RAF Wigsley	During 1942 it flew 12 operational sorties with a loss of two aircraft.
1655 MCU	Aug 42–May 43	Mosquito III/IV/XVI/B.20/B.25; Blenheim IV; Oxford I	RAF Horsham St. Faith; RAF Upper Heyford; RAF Marham	Became No. 1655 Mosquito Training Unit RAF at RAF Finmere; Eventually absorbed by No. 16 Operational Training Unit RAF
1656 HCU	Oct 42–Nov 45	Lancaster I/III; Halifax II/V; Manchester I Spitfire IIa/Vb; Hurricane IIC; Tiger Moth II	RAF Lindholme	Formed by merging 103 and 460 Squadron Conversion Fights.
1657 HCU	Oct 42–Dec 44	Stirling I/III/IV; Lancaster I/II; Tomahawk IIB; Oxford II; Hurricane IIC	RAF Stradishall	Formed by merging 7, 101 and 149 Squadron Conversion Fights.
1658 HCU	Oct 42–Apr 45	Halifax I/II/III; Oxford II; Hurricane IIC	RAF Riccall	Formed by merging 10, 76 and 78 Squadron Conversion Fights.
1659 HCU	Oct 42–Mar 43; Mar 43–Sep 45	Halifax I/II/III; Lancaster I/III; Oxford II; Spitfire IIa/Vb; Hurricane IIC; Tiger Moth	RAF Leeming; RAF Topcliffe	Formed by merging 405 and 408 Squadron Conversion Fights. Trained Canadian aircrew.
1660 HCU	Oct 42–Nov 46	Lancaster I/II/III; Halifax II; Manchester I Mosquito XIX; Stirling I/III; Oxford I Spitfire Vc; Hurricane IIC; Lysander I de Havilland Puss Moth	RAF Swinderby	Formed by merging 61, 97, 106 and 7 Squadron Conversion Fights. Absorbed by No. 1653 Heavy Conversion Unit.
1661 HCU	Nov 42–Aug 45	Lancaster I/II; Halifax II/V; Manchester I Mosquito XIII; Stirling III; Oxford II; Spitfire Vb; Hurricane IIC	RAF Winthorpe	Formed by merging 9, 44 and 49 Squadron Conversion Fights. Short Stirlings replaced the planned re-equipment with Handley Page Halifaxs.
1662 HCU	Jan 43–Apr 45	Lancaster I/II; Halifax I/II/III/V; Oxford II; Spitfire Vb; Hurricane IIC; Tiger Moth II	RAF Blyton	
1663 HCU	Mar 43–May 45	Halifax I/II/III/V; Stirling I Oxford II; Spitfire Vb; Hurricane IIC	RAF Rufforth	
1664 HCU; 1664 (RCAF)HCU	May 43–Apr 44; Apr 44–Apr 45	Lancaster I/III; Halifax II/III/V; Oxford II; Spitfire Vb; Hurricane IIC	RAF Croft; RAF Dishforth	The unit had the Canadian name Caribou.
1665 HCU; 1665 (HT)CU	Apr 43–Jun 43; Jun 43–Jan 44; Jan 44–Aug 45; Aug 45–Jul 46	Halifax III/V/VI/VII; Stirling I/III/IV; Oxford II; Spitfire IIa/Vb; Hurricane X Tiger Moth II; Mosquito VI; Lancaster I	RAF Mepal; RAF Woolfox Lodge; RAF Tilstock; RAF Saltby; RAF Marston Moor; RAF Linton-on-Ouse	Re-designated as No. 1665 (HT)CU on 10 August 1945
1666 HCU; 1666 (RCAF)HCU	Jun 43–Oct 43; Oct 43–Aug 45	Halifax II/III/V; Lancaster I/II/III; Oxford II; Spitfire IIa/Vb; Hurricane IIC	RAF Dalton; RAF Wombleton	The unit had the Canadian name Mohawk.
1667 HCU	Jun 43–Oct 43; Oct 43–Feb 44; Feb 44–Nov 45	Halifax II/V; Oxford II; Spitfire Vb; Hurricane IIC; Tiger Moth II; Lancaster I/III	RAF Lindholme; RAF Faldingworth; RAF Sandtoft	
1668 HCU	Aug 43–Nov 43; Jul 44–Mar 46	Lancaster I/II/III/X; Mosquito XIX; Spitfire Vb; Hurricane IIC; Beaufighter VI	RAF Balderton; RAF Bottesford	Disbanded November 1943, re-formed July 1944.
1669 HCU	Aug 44–Mar 45	Handley Page Halifax; Lancaster I/III; Spitfire Vb; Hurricane IIC	RAF Langar	
1670 (T)CU	Jun 44–Jan 45	Thunderbolt; Harvard IIB	RAF Yelahanka	Became No. 8 Refresher Flying Unit RAF
1671 CU	Feb 44–Jun 44	Beaufighter VI	RAF Baigachi	Formed from AI Mk VIII Conversion Flight RAF
1672 (M)CU	Feb 44–Aug 45	Blenheim V Mosquito III; Oxford I	RAF Yelahanka	
1673 HCU	Feb 44–Apr 44; Apr 44–Nov 44	Liberator III; Tiger Moth II; Anson I	RAF Salbani; RAF Kolar	Formed by re-designating No. 1584 (Heavy Bomber) Conversion Unit RAF.
1674 HCU	Oct 43–Nov 45	Liberator III/V/VI/VIII; Halifax II; Fortress I/II/IIA; Wellington XIII; Oxford I/II; Hurricane IIC; Martinet I	RAF Aldergrove various bases in Northern Ireland; RAF Lossiemouth	
1675 HCU	Oct 43–Aug 44; Aug 44–Oct 45	Liberator II; Harvard IIA; Hurricane IIB; Argus II	RAF Lydda; RAF Abu Sueir	Formed by re-designating No. 5 Heavy Bomber Conversion Unit RAF, Lydda
1678 HCU	Sep 43–Jun 44	Lancaster II	RAF Foulsham; RAF Waterbeach	
1679 HCF	May 43–Jan 44	Lancaster II	RAF East Moor; RAF Wombleton	Merged into No. 1666 HCU
1699 (BS)CU; 1699 HCU	Oct 44–Jun 45	Fortress II/III; Liberator VI; Lancastrian II	RAF Oulton; RAF Full Sutton	Became the Lancastrian Flight of No. 231 Squadron RAF
All-Weather OCU	?–?	Anson T.21; Vampire T.11; Meteor T.7/F.8/NF.12/NF.14	nomadic	
Argosy CU	Nov 61–Apr 63	Argosy C.1	RAF Benson	Became the Argosy Flight of 242 OCU
Belvedere CU	Aug 64–Aug 68	Belvedere HC.1	RAF Odiham	Absorbed by the Short Range Conversion Unit RAF
Short Range CU	Aug 64–Jul 67	Twin Pioneer CC.2; Wessex HC.2; Auster AOP.9	RAF Odiham	Became the Helicopter Operational Conversion Flight RAF
Jaguar OCU	Jun 74–Sep 74	Jaguar GR.1/T.2	RAF Lossiemouth	Formed from Jaguar Conversion Team RAF. Became 226 OCU
5 Heavy Bomber Conversion Unit	?–?	Liberator	RAF Lydda, RCAF Boundary Bay and RCAF Abbotsford]	Became No. 1675 Heavy Conversion Unit RAF. In April 1944 RCAF Boundary Bay No. 5 Operational Training Unit (for Heavy Conversion) established when 17 B-24 Liberators were scheduled to arrive fresh from American factories that first month. However, only sixteen would actually be delivered. By Sept 30th 1944 RCAF 5 O.T.U. reported B-24 Liberators; Abbotsford 24, Boundary Bay 14, total 38. B-25 Mitchells; Boundary Bay only total 35. Bolingbrokes; Boundary Bay only total 5. P-40 Kittyhawks; Boundary Bay only 8. Norseman; Boundary Bay only 1. Total aircraft on Unit strength 87
Heavy Bomber Conversion Unit, Salbani	Sep 42–Jul 43	Liberator III	RAF Salbani	Became No. 1584 (Heavy Bomber) Conversion Unit RAF – see above.
Heavy Glider Conversion Unit	Jul 42–Oct 44	Whitley V Albemarle I/GT.I/ST.II/ST.V; Horsa I/II; Oxford I/II; Tiger Moth II; Miles Magister	RAF Shrewton; RAF Brize Norton	Became No. 21 Heavy Glider Conversion Unit RAF
21 HGCU	Oct 44–Dec 47	Whitley V Albemarle GT.VI; Horsa I/II; Oxford I Tiger Moth I Miles Magister; Hotspur II/III; Hadrian I Stirling IV; Halifax III/VII; Master II	RAF Brize Norton; RAF North Luffenham	Formed by re-designation of the Heavy Glider Conversion Unit RAF
22 HGCU	Oct 44–Dec 47	Albemarle GT.I/ST.II/ST.V/GT.VI; Horsa I/II; Oxford I Hadrian I	RAF Keevil; RAF Blakehill Farm	Formed by re-designation of an element of the Heavy Glider Conversion Unit RAF
23 HGCU	Oct 44–Dec 45	Albemarle GT.I/ST.V/ST.VI; Horsa I/II; Oxford I Hadrian I Proctor III	RAF Peplow	Formed by elements of No. 83 Operation Training Unit the Heavy Glider Conversion Unit RAF

== Additional ==
- No. 26 Conversion Flight RAF
- No. 28 Conversion Flight RAF
- No. 106 Conversion Flight RAF
- No. 107 Conversion Flight RAF
- No. 108 Conversion Flight RAF
- No. 2 Tactical Air Force Sabre Conversion Flight RAF
- Bassett Conversion Flight RAF
- Blenheim Conversion Flight RAF
- Halifax Conversion Flight RAF
- Check and Conversion Flight RAF
- Halifax Conversion Flight RAF
- Helicopter Operational Conversion Flight RAF
- Hornet Conversion Flight RAF
- Lancaster Conversion Flight RAF
- Lincoln Conversion Flight RAF
- Mosquito Conversion Flight RAF
- Phantom Conversion Flight RAF
- Photographic Reconnaissance Conversion Flight RAF
- Sabre Conversion Flight RAF

== See also ==
Royal Air Force

  - List of Royal Air Force aircraft squadrons
  - List of Royal Air Force aircraft independent flights
  - List of Royal Air Force Glider units
  - List of Royal Air Force Operational Training Units
  - List of Royal Air Force schools
  - List of Royal Air Force units & establishments
  - List of RAF squadron codes
  - List of RAF Regiment units
  - List of Battle of Britain squadrons
  - List of wings of the Royal Air Force

Army Air Corps

- List of Army Air Corps aircraft units
- Fleet Air Arm
  - List of Fleet Air Arm aircraft squadrons
  - List of Fleet Air Arm groups
  - List of aircraft units of the Royal Navy
  - List of aircraft wings of the Royal Navy
- Others
  - List of Air Training Corps squadrons
  - University Air Squadron
  - Air Experience Flight
  - Volunteer Gliding Squadron
