= RAF Swinderby =

Former Royal Air Force base in Lincolnshire, England

RAF Swinderby
- Near Swinderby, Lincolnshire in England
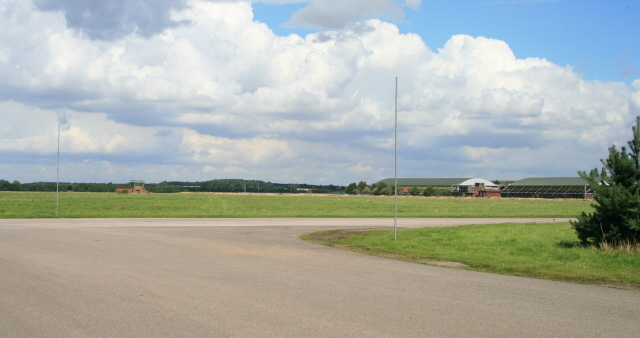
- Former RAF Swinderby during 2008.

- Haec porta moenia viri (Latin for 'This is the gate, the walls are men')

Site information
- Type: Royal Air Force flying station
- Owner: Ministry of Defence
- Operator: Royal Air Force
- Condition: Closed

Location
- Location in Lincolnshire
- Coordinates: 53°08′49″N 000°40′16″W

Site history
- Built: 1940
- In use: 1940–1993
- Fate: Sold in 1995, the technical site is now an industrial estate and domestic site became the village of Witham St Hughs. The airfield remains and is disused.

Airfield information
- Identifiers: ICAO: EGXS
- Elevation: 19 metres (62 ft) AMSL
Runways
Direction	Length and surface
02/22	Asphalt
06/24	1,845 metres (6,053 ft) Asphalt
11/29	1,268 metres (4,160 ft) Asphalt

Royal Air Force Swinderby or more simply RAF Swinderby is a former Royal Air Force station airfield opened in 1940, one of the last of the stations completed under the RAF's expansion plans started in the 1930s. It was built near the village of Swinderby, Lincolnshire just off the south east side of the A46 (the Fosse Way) between Newark-on-Trent, Nottinghamshire and Lincoln, Lincolnshire, England.

The station closed on 17 December 1993.

== History ==
Under the command of No. 1 Group RAF, Swinderby came under the auspices of RAF Bomber Command and housed several bomber squadrons, among others No. 300 Polish Bomber Squadron and No. 301 Polish Bomber Squadron, initially flying the Fairey Battle, then Vickers Wellington. Other squadrons operated aircraft, such as the Handley Page Hampden.

On 16 July 1941 the newly created Polish Air Force Colour was presented to General Sikorski, the Polish Commander-in-Chief, in the presence of many dignitaries, in a solemn ceremony at RAF Swinderby. It was then handed to No. 300 Bomber Squadron, the senior Polish Squadron in Britain, resident at Swinderby. Thereafter it was rotated to other Polish Squadrons every 3 months.

In the 1950s and early 1960s it was the home of No. 8 Flying Training School RAF, converting trainee pilots to de Havilland Vampires. In 1956 it hosted a brief experiment to keep all the flying training to wings stage straight through on one base. This was abandoned after a month due to the obvious danger of collisions in the circuit between the Vampires and the much slower piston engined Percival Provost basic trainers.

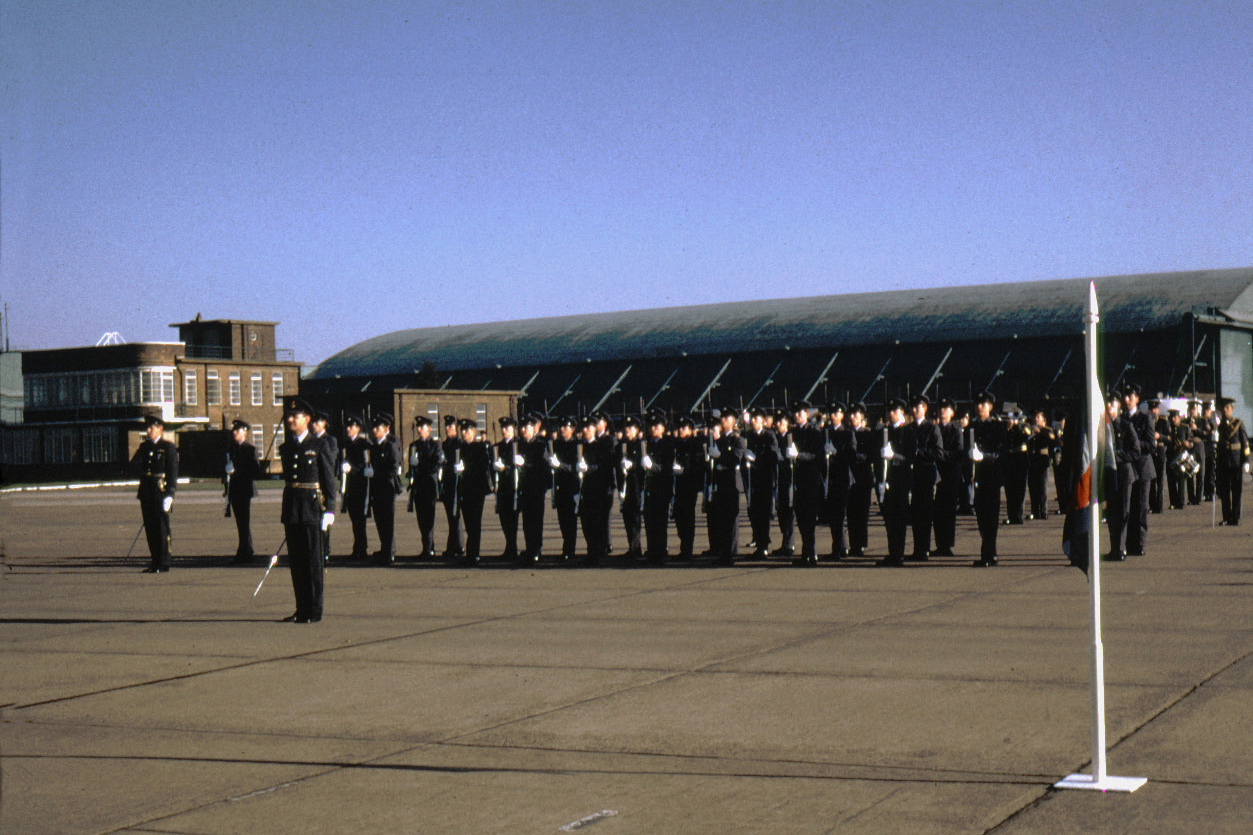
Passing out parade in November 1971.

In 1964 RAF Swinderby changed its role to that of recruit training when No.7 School of Recruit Training, formerly at RAF Bridgnorth, opened at RAF Swinderby. It became responsible for the basic training of all male enlisted personnel prior to their trade training, in August 1964 intake 7/46 was the first pass out parade at RAF Swinderby. Females were still trained at RAF Hereford in 1976 and in 1982 the very first integrated Flight (i.e. male and female recruits) passed out in November at RAF Swinderby. In July 1993 No.1 Squadron 6 Flight was the final pass out parade before the RAF School of Recruit Training moved to RAF Halton.

In August 1984 Sqn Ldr Josephine (Jo) Kingston, an RAF doctor aged 41 from Chicklade in Wiltshire, was trained as the first female RAF pilot. Most women in the RAF left after four years, so it was not economic to train women fighter pilots.

A live LP recording of a passing out parade was made in 1973, featuring the Midland Band of the Royal Air Force. It included all the commands and sounds of the parade.

RAF Swinderby closed on 17 December 1993, with the Joint Elementary Flying Training Squadron having previously moved to RAF Topcliffe in North Yorkshire.

== Squadrons ==
Squadron	Equipment	From	To	To	Notes
No. 50 Squadron RAF	Handley Page Hampden	20 July 1941	26 November 1941	RAF Skellingthorpe	
No. 300 Squadron (Polish) RAF	Fairey Battle; Vickers Wellington IC	22 August 1940	18 July 1941	RAF Hemswell	
No. 301 Squadron (Polish) RAF	Battle; Wellington IC	29 August 1940	18 July 1941	RAF Hemswell	
No. 455 Squadron RAAF	Hampden	6 June 1941	8 February 1942	RAF Wigsley	Formed here.

== Units ==
The following units were also here at some point:

- No. 5 Group Communication Flight RAF (November 1943 - December 1945)
- No. 13 Aircraft Modification Unit RAF (September 1945 - March 1946)
- No. 17 Operational Training Unit RAF (October 1946 - March 1947) became No. 201 Advanced Flying School RAF (March 1947 - 1 June 1954) became No. 11 Flying Training School RAF (June 1954 - June 1955)
- No. 50 Conversion Flight RAF (June - August 1942)
- No. 51 Base RAF
- No. 61 Conversion Flight RAF (August - October 1942)
- No. 75 Base RAF
- No. 91 Group Communication Flight RAF (April 1947 - May 1947) became No. 21 Group Communication Flight RAF (May 1947 - March 1955)
- No. 97 Conversion Flight RAF (October 1942)
- No. 106 Conversion Flight RAF (October 1942)
- No. 204 Advanced Flying School RAF (June 1950 - February 1952)
- No. 207 Conversion Flight RAF (August - October 1942)
- No. 1654 Conversion Unit RAF (May - June 1942)
- No. 1660 Heavy Conversion Unit RAF (October 1942 - November 1946)
- No. 2726 Squadron RAF Regiment
- No. 2776 Squadron RAF Regiment
- Flying Selection Squadron RAF (July 1979 - June 1987) became Elementary Flying Training Squadron RAF (1987-April 1993)
- Temporary Relief Landing Ground for the RAF College (April - May 1965)
- RAF School of Recruit Training (October 1970 - July 1993)

== Current use ==
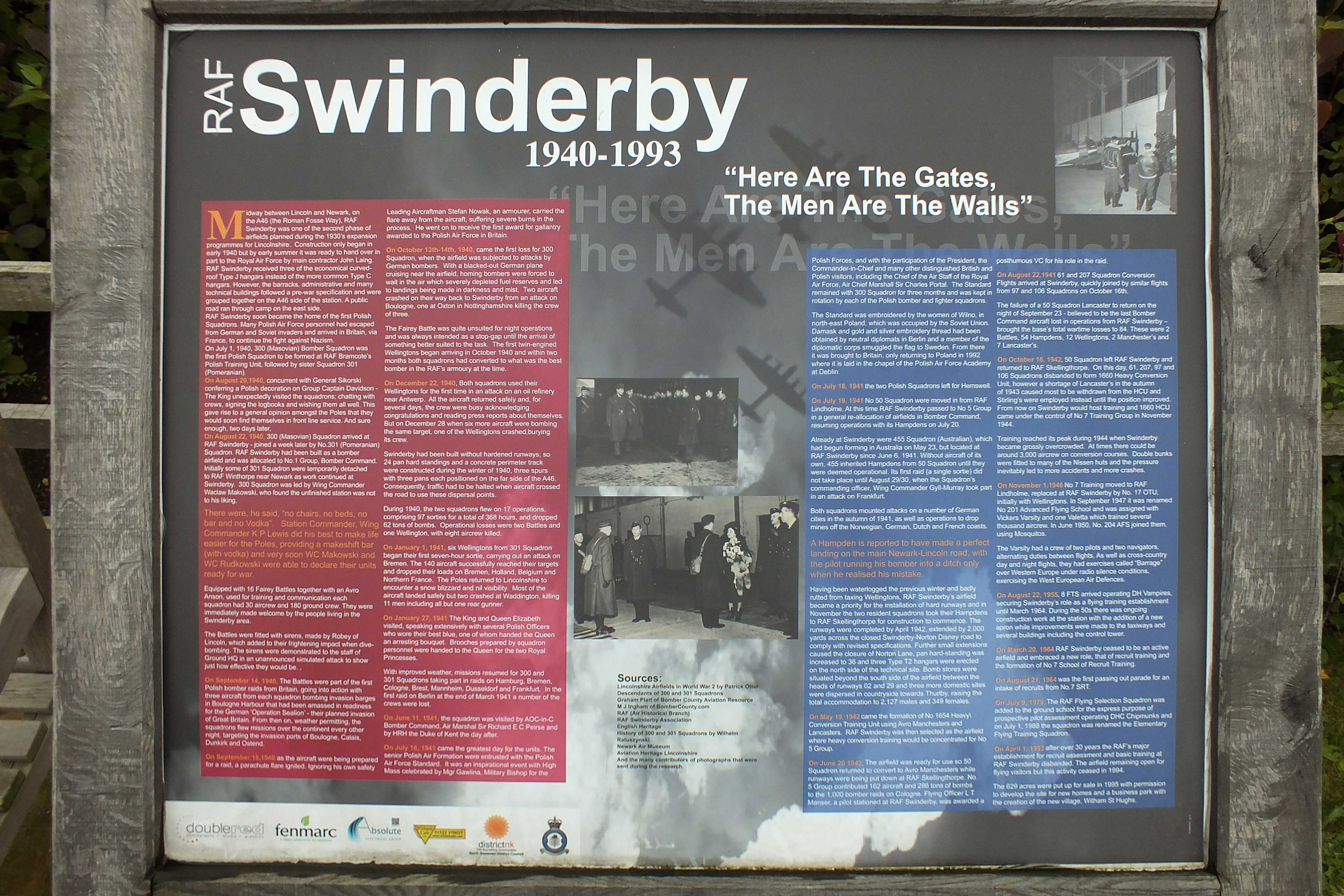
Information board outside the new village hall, 2013.

In 1995 the station was put up for sale, where the land was purchased by Cemex for commercial mining. However, Cemex continued to rent the land to International Antiques & Collectors Fairs five times a year for the Swinderby Antiques Fair.

In 2013 the hangars and the air traffic control tower remained in evidence along with acres of concrete runways and taxiways but most of the other buildings on the technical site have been demolished. In 2014 only 2 hangars remained, but the control tower was demolished.

The domestic site has been developed as the new village of Witham St Hughs with only the former Officer's Married Quarters and Airmen's Married Quarters remaining. The new village hall has an information board giving the history of RAF Swinderby.

On 10 May 2014 a memorial was dedicated to all those Servicemen and Servicewomen who served at RAF Swinderby from 1940 to 1993. It is situated by the modern village hall, adjacent to the information board and the bench "Remembering No. 300 & No. 301 Polish Squadrons who served with the Royal Air Force at RAF Swinderby during WW II".

The Explorer Scouts unit based in the village of Swinderby, is named EGXS, a reference to the ICAO location indicator of the airfield. Their badge includes the layout of Swinderby's runways.
