= RAF Woolfox Lodge =

Former Royal Air Force station in Rutland, England

RAF Woolfox Lodge
- Pickworth, Rutland in England

Site information
- Type: Royal Air Force station
- Code: WL
- Owner: Ministry of Defence
- Operator: Royal Air Force; United States Army Air Forces
- Controlled by: RAF Bomber Command * No. 3 Group RAF * No. 5 Group RAF * No. 7 (T) Group RAF

Location
- Shown within Rutland
- Coordinates: 52°42′34″N 000°34′33″W

Site history
- Built: 1939/40
- Built by: John Mowlem Ltd
- In use: December 1940 - January 1966
- Battles/wars: European theatre of World War II

Airfield information
- Elevation: 105 metres (344 ft) AMSL
Runways
Direction	Length and surface
00/00	Tarmac
00/00	Tarmac
00/00	Tarmac

Royal Air Force Woolfox Lodge, or more simply RAF Woolfox Lodge, is a former Royal Air Force station next to the A1 road in Rutland, UK. The airfield is split between the parishes of Empingham and Greetham. It was open from 1940 until 1966.

== History ==
Woolfox opened as a reserve landing ground for RAF Cottesmore then became a satellite to RAF North Luffenham in October 1941. Full station status was granted from June 1943. The wartime airfield comprised three tarmac runways and one Type B1 and four T2 aircraft hangars. There was temporary accommodation for 1,149 male and 252 female personnel.

RAF Woolfox Lodge was used in later years as a relief landing ground but the runways deteriorated to such a degree that the airfield had to be closed to flying by spring 1954. In 1960 a Bristol Bloodhound surface-to-air missile site under No. 62 Squadron RAF was positioned in a secure area adjacent to the A1 road near the former technical site.

== RAF units and aircraft ==
Unit	Dates	Aircraft	Variant	Notes
No. 61 Squadron RAF	September 1941 - May 1942	Avro Manchester Avro Lancaster	I I & III	Lancaster from April 1942
No. 62 Squadron RAF	February 1960 - September 1964	Bristol Bloodhound	I	
No. 218 Squadron RAF	March - August 1944	Short Stirling	III	

The following units were here at some point:

- Detachment from No. 3 Lancaster Finishing School RAF during August 1944
- Relief Landing Ground for No. 7 Flying Training School RAF between May 1941 and April 1954
- Satellite of No. 14 OTU between December 1940 and August 1941
- Satellite of No. 29 OTU between August 1942 and June 1943
- No. 33 Heavy Glider Maintenance Section
- No. 61 Squadron Conversion Flight RAF
- No. 259 Maintenance Unit RAF between August 1945 and April 1946 and as a sub site between April 1946 and August 1948
- No. 1429 (Czech Operational Training) Flight RAF between June and August 1942
- No. 1651 Heavy Conversion Unit RAF between November 1944 and July 1945
- No. 1665 Heavy Conversion Unit RAF between June 1943 and January 1944

== Current use ==
The site is now used for agriculture and employment purposes.

The landowner in 2019 has proposed it as a site for a possible garden village.
