= No. 242 Operational Conversion Unit RAF =

No. 242 Operational Conversion Unit RAF
- Active: 1951-1992; Previous identities: 1944-1951
- Country: United Kingdom
- Branch: Royal Air Force
- Role: Transport training
- Last base: RAF Lyneham

No. 242 Operational Conversion Unit RAF is a former Royal Air Force Operational conversion unit which operated between 16 April 1951 and 1 July 1992 when the unit became No. 57 Squadron RAF.

== History ==
No. 242 OCU

=== Argosy Conversion Unit ===
The Argosy Conversion Unit was formed at RAF Benson on 1 November 1961 to convert new pilots onto the Armstrong Whitworth AW.660 Argosy. The unit was disbanded on 30 April 1963 to become Argosy Flight, 242 OCU.

The Andover Training Flight was formed at RAF Abingdon on 1 July 1966.

=== No. 240 Operational Conversion Unit RAF ===
No. 240 Operational Conversion Unit RAF was formed by the merging of No. 1333 Transport Support Training Unit RAF and No. 1382 (Transport) Conversion Unit RAF on 5 January 1948 at RAF North Luffenham. It used Douglas Dakotas and de Havilland Devons to train new pilots until 16 April 1951 when still at North Luffenham it was disbanded and merged with No. 241 OCU to become No. 242 OCU.

=== No. 241 Operational Conversion Unit RAF ===
No. 241 Operational Conversion Unit RAF was formed at Dishforth on 5 January 1948 and operated a number of different aircraft types such as Handley Page Hastings, Vickers Valettas and Avro Ansons until 16 April 1951 while still at Dishforth the unit was disbanded and merged with No. 240 OCU to become No. 242 OCU.

No. 1332 Heavy Transport Conversion Unit

No. 1332 HTCU was formed at RAF Longtown on 5 September 1944 as No. 1332 (Transport) Heavy Conversion Unit and operated a variety of aircraft including Consolidated Liberators, Avro Yorks, Short Stirlings and Handley Page Halifaxes. It was renamed to No. 1332 Heavy Transport Conversion Unit from May 1947, it was disbanded on 5 January 1948 at RAF Dishforth to become No. 241 OCU.

== See also ==
- List of conversion units of the Royal Air Force
