= No. 292 Squadron RAAF =

Royal Australian Air Force squadron

- Active: 1977–current
- Branch: Royal Australian Air Force
- Role: Operational conversion and training unit
- Part of: No. 92 Wing
- Garrison/HQ: RAAF Base Edinburgh
- Motto: Prepare the Hunter
- Aircraft: P-8A Poseidon and MQ-4C Triton

No. 292 Squadron is a Royal Australian Air Force (RAAF) operational conversion unit based at RAAF Base Edinburgh, South Australia. The squadron was formed on 1 January 1977 as the Maritime Analysis Training Squadron and renamed No. 292 Squadron on 27 October 1980. Throughout its history it has formed part of No. 92 Wing and been responsible for training aircrew to operate the RAAF's Lockheed P-3 Orion and Boeing P-8A Poseidon maritime patrol aircraft. It took responsibility for training Poseidon maintenance and operations personnel in 2018.

== History ==
The Maritime Analysis Training Squadron was formed at RAAF Base Edinburgh on 1 January 1977 as part of the No. 92 Wing RAAF Training Centre. Its role was to provide operational conversion training for pilots and sensor operators assigned to the Royal Australian Air Force's fleet of Lockheed P-3 Orion maritime patrol aircraft (which were also based at Edinburgh), develop new tactics for the aircraft and trial new equipment. Upon formation, it comprised an Air Training Flight and an administrative cell; an Analysis Flight was subsequently added to the unit. On 27 October 1980 the squadron was renamed No. 292 Squadron.

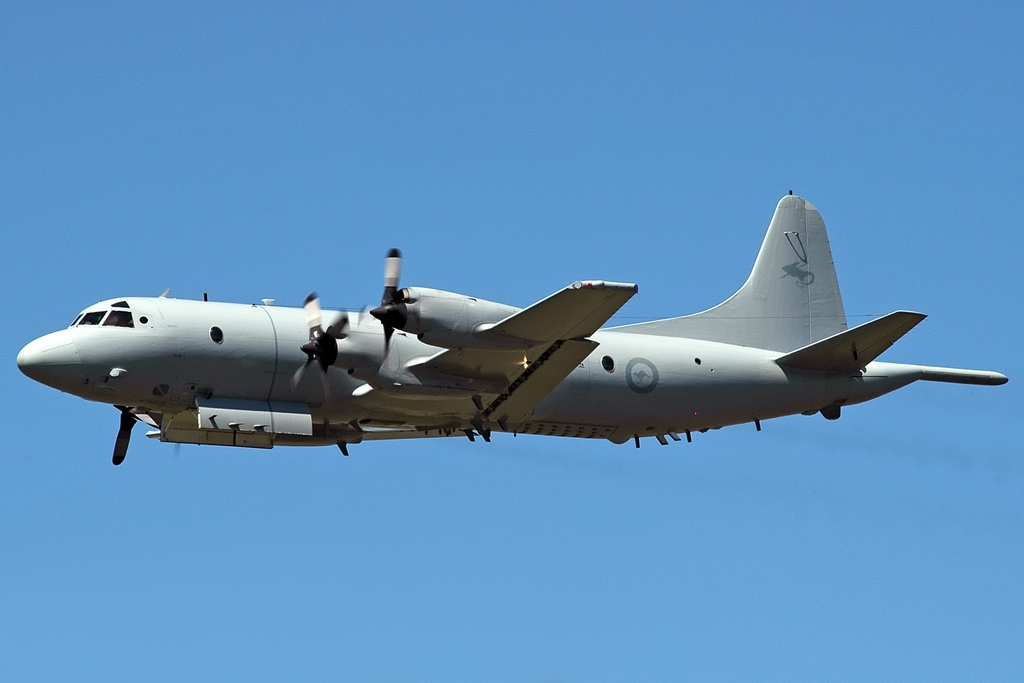
An AP-3C Orion in 2008

The squadron's first training courses began in January 1977. As part of the conversion training courses, students travel to various Australian Defence Force bases to build their familiarity with the ADF's maritime warfare capabilities and doctrine and participate in exercises in Australia and allied countries in the Pacific region. Students also take part in operational search and rescue and fishery surveillance flights. After completing their training with No. 292 Squadron, aircrew are posted to either No. 10 or No. 11 Squadron. As all the RAAF's Orions are pooled across No. 92 Wing's three flying units, No. 292 Squadron shares its aircraft with the two operational squadrons.

As part of the upgrade of the RAAF's Orions to AP-3C Orion standard, No. 292 Squadron re-retrained all of No. 92 Wing's flight crews to operate the much-improved aircraft. The first three-month long transition course was completed in May 2002. At this time the squadron included an AP-3C Transition Training Cell.

As of 2011, No. 292 Squadron included a Maintenance Training Flight which was responsible for training fitters to work on AP-3Cs aircraft. On 27 September 2012, the squadron was presented with the Governor General's banner by the Governor of South Australia, His Excellency Rear Admiral Kevin Scarce. These banners are awarded to RAAF units which have been in existence for 25 years. At this time, the squadron had a strength of 120 personnel and was responsible for training aircrew and ground crew to work on AP-3C Orions, as well as undertaking operational support tasks.

In 2015, No. 292 Squadron also became responsible for conducting maintenance test flights for the AP-3C fleet after the aircraft complete deep maintenance at RAAF Base Richmond, and then flying the aircraft back to Edinburgh. This change was part of a set of reforms intended to improve the efficiency of No. 92 Wing's procedures to permit more flying time to be allocated for operational flights.

No. 292 Squadron will remain part of No. 92 Wing following the replacement of the AP-3Cs with Boeing P-8 Poseidons. As of 2015, the first of the new aircraft was scheduled to arrive in Australia in 2017 and No. 292 Squadron will begin the first local training course using the type the next year. A new operational conversion facility will be constructed at Edinburgh to facilitate this training.

In 2018, No. 292 Squadron commenced Boeing P-8A Poseidon training for aircrew, maintenance and operations personnel in the newly-built Integrated Training Centre with simulation and classroom facilities.

No. 292 Squadron will also provide instructor crews for the RAAF's fleet of MQ-4C Triton aircraft.
