= RAF Wombleton =

Royal Air Force base in Yorkshire, England

RAF Wombleton
- Wombleton, North Yorkshire in England
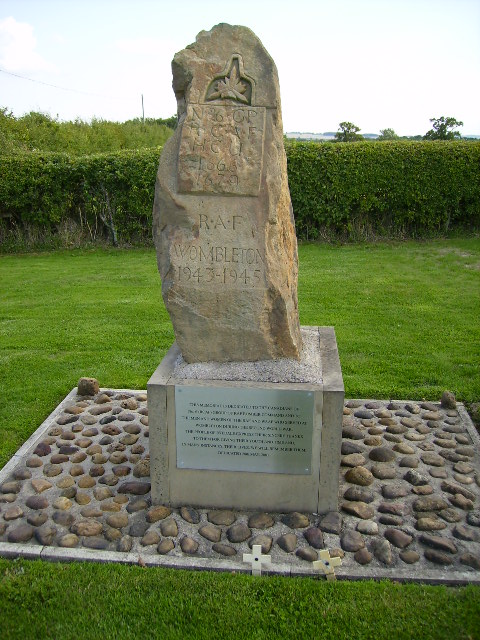
- Memorial to the Royal Canadian Air Force. Inscription reads: "This memorial is dedicated to the Canadians of No.6 (RCAF) Group of RAF Bomber Command and to the men and women of the RAF and WAAF who served at Wombleton during the Second World War. The people of Ryedale express their sincere thanks to them for giving their youth and time and, in many instances, their lives. We will remember them. Dedicated 28th May, 2001."

Site information
- Type: RAF Sub-station
- Code: UN
- Owner: Air Ministry
- Operator: Royal Air Force; Royal Canadian Air Force
- Controlled by: RAF Bomber Command * No. 6 (T) Group RCAF * No. 7 (T) Group RAF

Location
- Shown within North Yorkshire RAF Wombleton (the United Kingdom)
- Coordinates: 54°13′59″N 000°58′09″W

Site history
- Built: 1942/43
- In use: October 1943 – 1949
- Battles/wars: European theatre of World War II

Airfield information
- Elevation: 36 metres (118 ft) AMSL
Runways
Direction	Length and surface
00/00	Concrete
00/00	Concrete
00/00	Concrete

Royal Air Force Wombleton or RAF Wombleton is a former Royal Air Force sub-station located 3.8 miles (6.1 km) east of Helmsley, North Yorkshire and 11.8 miles (19 km) north-east of Easingwold, North Yorkshire, England.

== Station history ==
Wombleton opened in 1943 as a sub-station of RAF Topcliffe. It was part of RAF Bomber Command's No. 6 Group RCAF, and along with the main station at Topcliffe and the station at Dishforth, was designated part of No. 61 (Training) Base. In November 1944, No. 61 Base was transferred to No 7 (Training) Group and it was renumbered No. 76 Training Base. No. 1666 Heavy Conversion Unit (HCU) was the first unit to move to Wombleton. Aircrew who were originally trained on twin-engined aircraft such as Vickers Wellingtons or Armstrong Whitworth Whitleys received conversion training on heavy four-engined bombers such as the Handley Page Halifax or Avro Lancaster. No. 1666 HCU remained at Wombleton until the end of the war. The RAF took over the station and stayed for several years with the RAF Regiment using the site as a battle school.

== Units and aircraft ==
Unit	From	To	Aircraft	Version	Notes
No. 1666 'Mohawk' HCU	21 October 1943	3 August 1945	Handley Page Halifax; Avro Lancaster	Mks.II, III, V Mks.I, II, III, X	
No. 1679 HCF	13 December 1943	27 January 1944	Avro Lancaster	Mk.II	Disbanded into 1666 HCU
No. 261 Maintenance Unit RAF	15 November 1945	10 September 1946			

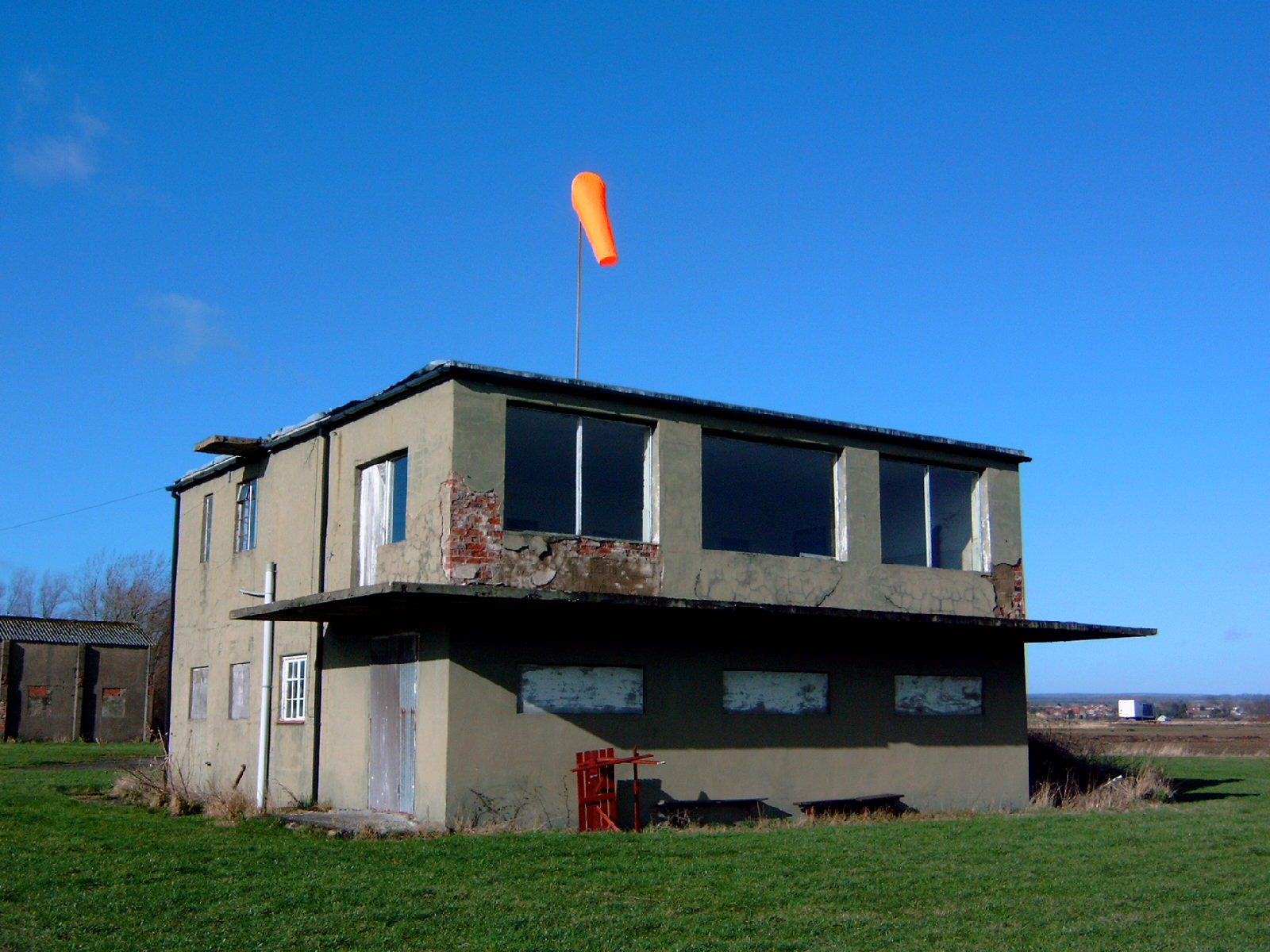
The former Flying Control at RAF Wombleton (2007)

== Current use ==
Wombleton aerodrome is now used for aircraft maintenance.

== See also ==
- List of former Royal Air Force stations
