= No. 61 Squadron RAF =

Defunct flying squadron of the Royal Air Force

- Active: 24 Jul 1917 – 13 June 1919; 8 March 1937 – 31 March 1958
- Country: United Kingdom
- Branch: Royal Air Force
- Nickname: "Hull's 'own' Squadron"
- Mottos: Latin: Per purum tonantes ("Thundering through the clear air")
- Mascot: The Lincoln Imp

Insignia
- Squadron Badge heraldry: The Lincoln Imp; The figure associates the squadron with the county in which it was re-formed in 1937 and where it spent most of its active days in World War II.
- Squadron Codes: LS (Mar 1939 – Sep 1939); QR (Sep 1939 – Apr 1951)

No. 61 Squadron was a squadron of the Royal Air Force. It was first formed as a fighter squadron of the British Royal Flying Corps during the First World War. It was reformed in 1937 as a bomber squadron of the Royal Air Force and served in the Second World War and afterwards into the jet age, until disbanded in 1958.

== History ==
=== First World War ===
No. 61 Squadron was formed at RAF Rochford, on the outskirts of Southend, Essex, in July/August 1917 as one of the first single-seater fighter squadrons of the London Air Defence Area, intended to counter the German daylight air raids. It was equipped with the Sopwith Pup. The squadron first went into action on 12 August, when a formation of ten Gotha G.IV bombers approached the Thames Estuary. Sixteen Pups of No. 61 Squadron took off to intercept them and, together with aircraft from other squadrons, succeeded in turning the enemy back. However, two bombs had been dropped near No. 61's hangars on Rochford Aerodrome, five more at Leigh-on-Sea, seven at Westcliff, and 17 in Southend itself. In 1918 the squadron was re-equipped with SE5s, but before the Armistice was signed it began to change over to Sopwith Camels. The squadron used these and from January 1919 also some Sopwith Snipes until disbanded on 13 June 1919.

=== Second World War ===
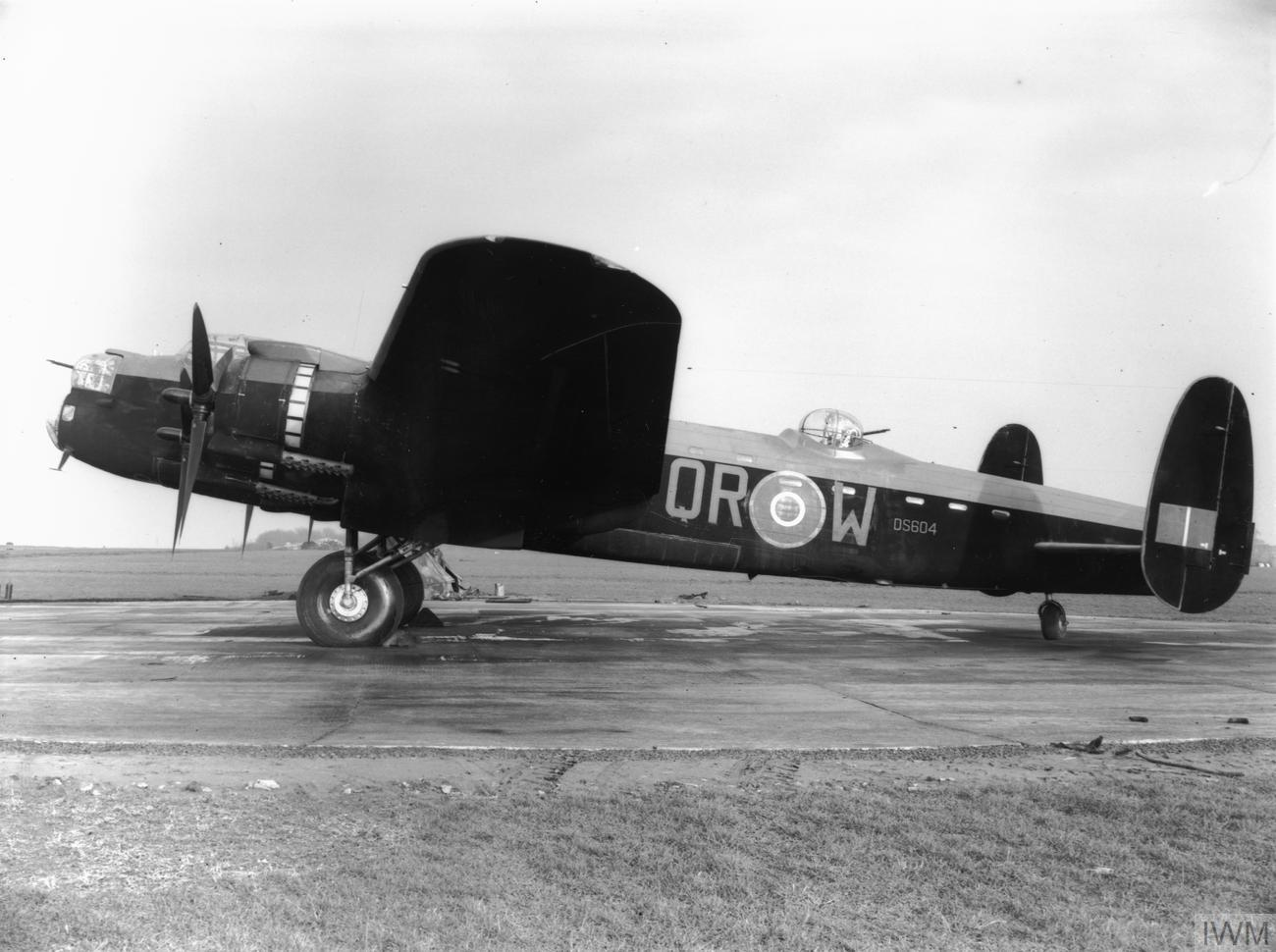
Lancaster Mark II of 61 Squadron at RAF Syerston

No. 61 Squadron was re-formed on 8 March 1937 as a bomber squadron, and in World War II flew with No. 5 Group, RAF Bomber Command. The squadron's first operational mission was on 25 December 1939, comprising an armed reconnaissance over the North Sea by 11 Hampden bombers. This was followed on 7/8 March 1940 by the first bombing mission, when one Hampden, during a security patrol of Sylt-Borkum-Norderney, bombed an enemy destroyer which opened fire on it.

The unit took part in many notable operations including:

- the first bombing raid on a German land target (Hörnum, 19/20 March 1940);
- the first big bombing raid on the German mainland (Mönchengladbach, 11/12 May 1940): (RAF records record about half of the 36 'planes hit their targets, and four people killed on the ground; one of whom was a British woman living in Germany).
- the first bombing raid on Berlin (25/26 August 1940);
- the attacks on Le Creusot and Peenemünde (17 October 1942 and 17/18 August 1943, respectively);
- the successive drainings of the Dortmund-Ems and Mittelland Canals (late 1944);
- the attack on Wesel just before the crossing of the Rhine (23/24 March 1945).

Beginning operations with Hampdens, the squadron converted in July 1941 to the more modern Manchesters and later (spring 1942), Lancasters. Four of its Lancasters; ED860 "N-Nan", EE176, JB138, and LL483, each became veterans of more than 100 operational sorties. Records show that in the case of the first three aircraft, the long road to their centuries included participation in the raid on 3/4 November 1943, when Flight Lieutenant William Reid of No. 61 Squadron won the Victoria Cross.

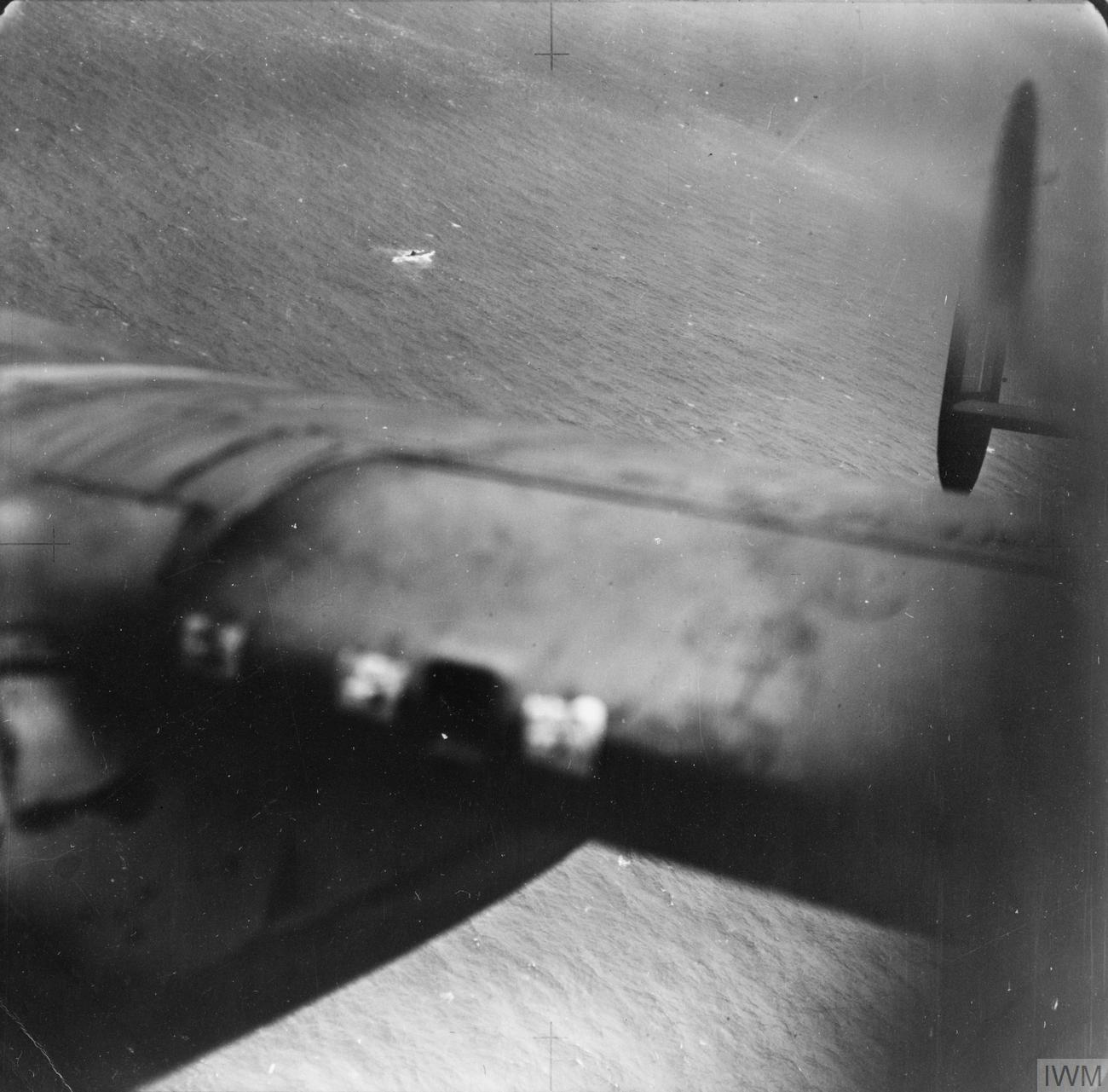
View looking backwards from 61 Squadron Lancaster R5724, showing U-751 under attack, Jul 1942

In the summer of 1942 No. 61 was twice loaned to RAF Coastal Command for anti-submarine operations in the Bay of Biscay. It was detached from its base in Rutland to St Eval in Cornwall, and on the very first occasion that it operated from there, 17 July, a crew captained by Flight Lieutenant PR Casement (Lancaster I R5724) became the first Bomber Command crew to bring back irrefutable evidence that they had destroyed a U-boat at sea, in the form of a photograph showing the crew of U-751 in the water swimming away from their sinking vessel.

The squadron's last operational mission in World War II was on 25/26 April 1945, when 10 Lancasters bombed an oil refinery and tankerage at Vallø (Tønsberg), and four other Lancasters aborted. The last mission before VE Day was on 6 May 1945, when the squadron's Lancasters ferried 336 ex-POWs home to the UK from Europe.

=== Post-war ===
No. 61 Squadron re-equipped with Avro Lincolns in May 1946. These saw action in Malaya as part of Operation Firedog and in Kenya during the Mau Mau Uprising. The squadron became an English Electric Canberra squadron at RAF Wittering in 1954. These took part in the Suez Crisis of 1956. No. 61 disbanded on 31 March 1958.

== Aircraft operated ==
From	To	Aircraft	Variant
Aug 1917	Jan 1918	Sopwith Pup	
Dec 1917	Oct 1918	Royal Aircraft Factory S.E.5	SE.5a
Oct 1918	Jun 1919	Sopwith Camel	
Jan 1919	Jun 1919	Sopwith Snipe	
Mar 1937	Apr 1937	Hawker Audax	
Mar 1937	Jan 1938	Avro Anson	Mk.I
Jan 1938	Mar 1939	Bristol Blenheim	Mk.I
Feb 1939	Oct 1941	Handley Page Hampden	Mk.I
Jul 1941	Jun 1942	Avro Manchester	Mk.I
May 1942	May 1946	Avro Lancaster	Mks.I, III
Oct 1942	Mar 1943	Avro Lancaster	Mk.II
May 1946	Aug 1954	Avro Lincoln	B.2
Aug 1954	Mar 1958	English Electric Canberra	B.2

== Bases operated from ==
From	To	Base
Jul 1917	Jun 1919	RAF Rochford
Mar 1937	Jul 1941	RAF Hemswell (Detachment at Wick during Nov-Dec 1939) for ops with Coastal Command )
Jul 1941	Oct 1941	RAF North Luffenham
Oct 1941	May 1942	RAF Woolfox Lodge
May 1942	Nov 1943	RAF Syerston (Detached to RAF St Eval on loan to Coastal Command in July and again in August 1942)
Nov 1943	Feb 1944	RAF Skellingthorpe
Feb 1944	Apr 1944	RAF Coningsby
Apr 1944	Jun 1945	RAF Skellingthorpe
June 1945	Jan 1946	RAF Sturgate
Jan 1946	May 1951	RAF Waddington
Jul 1947	Dec 1947	RAF Hemswell (Detachment)
Dec 1950	Apr 1951	RAF Tengah, Singapore (Detachment)
May 1951	Aug 1953	RAF Waddington
Aug 1953	Jun 1955	RAF Wittering
Mar 1954	Jun 1954	RAF Eastleigh, Kenya (Detachment)
Jul 1955	Mar 1958	RAF Upwood
Oct 1956	Jan 1957	RAF Nicosia, Cyprus (Detachment)

== See also ==
- German submarine U-852
