= RAF Bassingbourn =

Former military airbase in Cambridgeshire, England

RAF Bassingbourn USAAF Station 121
- Near Royston, Cambridgeshire in England
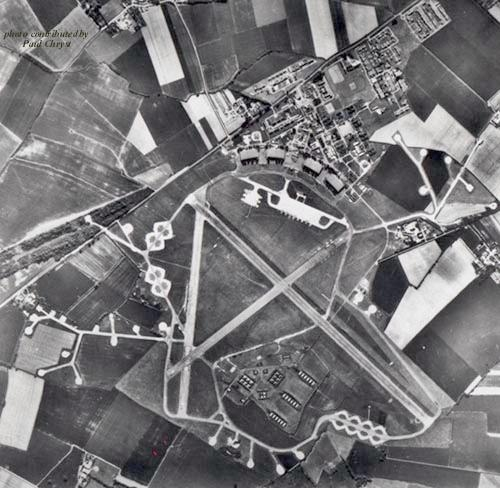
- 1955 Aerial photograph

Site information
- Type: Royal Air Force station
- Code: BS
- Owner: Ministry of Defence
- Operator: Royal Air Force; United States Army Air Forces; United States Air Force
- Controlled by: RAF Bomber Command (1938-1942; 1951-1969) * No. 3 Group RAF * No. 6 (T) Group RAF * No. 7 (T) Group RAF * No. 92 (OTU) Group RAF; Eighth Air Force (1942-1945); RAF Transport Command (1945-1949); United States Air Forces in Europe (1950-1953); British Army (1969 – present)

Location
- Shown within Cambridgeshire RAF Bassingbourn (the United Kingdom)
- Coordinates: 52°05′48″N 000°03′11″W
- Grid reference: TL335458

Site history
- Built: 1937/38
- Built by: John Laing & Son Ltd
- In use: March 1938 - 2014
- Battles/wars: European theatre of World War II; Cold War

Airfield information
- Elevation: 78 feet (24 m) AMSL
Runways
Direction	Length and surface
07/25	1,825 metres (5,988 ft) Asphalt
13/31	1,310 metres (4,298 ft) Asphalt
17/35	1,270 metres (4,167 ft) Asphalt

Royal Air Force Bassingbourn or more simply RAF Bassingbourn is a former Royal Air Force station located in Cambridgeshire approximately 3 miles (4.8 km) north of Royston, Hertfordshire and 11 miles (18 km) south west of Cambridge, Cambridgeshire, England.

During the Second World War it served first as an RAF station and then as a bomber airfield of the Eighth Air Force, of the United States Army Air Forces (USAAF). It remains the home of the Tower Museum Bassingbourn.

== Origin and development ==
=== Construction ===
RAF Bassingbourn was constructed by John Laing & Son between 1937 and 1939 in the parishes of Wendy and Bassingbourn immediately to the west of the old A14 road (now marked as the A1198). The site selected was low ground between several tributaries of the River Cam. The area had been long cleared of forest and tended to be swampy and unstable, and because the boggy ground produced a persistent mist over the large meadow the site was considered ideal for airfield camouflage.

The project was begun in April 1937 under the direction of Maurice Laing, with Reginald Silk as the site engineer and John Crowther the site surveyor. Four C Type hangars (300 ft (91 m) long by 152 ft (46 m) wide by 29 ft (8.8 m) high, with eleven roof gables and hipped ends) were erected by a sub-contractor in a semi-circle at the south edge of the airfield site approximately one mile north of the hamlet of Kneesworth. Laing then began work pouring concrete foundations for the technical site buildings, communal sites and barracks; the nature of the ground necessitated the rebuilding of several foundations that had sunk into the ground. Roadway cores were built of unusual thickness to prevent crumbling of the pavement.

The technical site was built with permanent, kerbed streets and landscaped. Originally treeless, Bassingbourn was made one of the most attractive RAF stations by the planting of hundreds of plum trees as part of the project.

The runways were originally grass. The Bristol Blenheim light bombers that first used the field were able to operate under the existing conditions, although landings often produced pronounced water splashes, but the weight of heavier bombers tore ruts in the grass surface and limited take-off speeds.

=== The runways ===
W. & C. French Ltd. constructed three concrete runways surfaced with asphalt during the winter of 1941–1942: a 3,600 feet (1,100 m) runway aligned southwest to northeast, one of 2,800 feet (850 m) crossing it north–south, and a 3,300 feet (1,000 m) runway connecting the northern ends of the first two. The Class A airfield standard was promulgated by the Air Ministry in August 1942 and the runways at Bassingbourn were immediately extended. The main runway was lengthened to 6,000 feet (1,800 m) by extending it west, with the use of extensive tile drainage, across a moat off the Mill River. The north–south runway was extended 1,300 feet (400 m) south, and the third runway lengthened 1,000 feet (300 m) to the northwest. Additional perimeter track was added around the bomb store site, which was doubled in area, to reach the west end of the main runway. Ultimately seven miles of taxiway were paved.

Four dispersal areas were also built. Dispersal A was placed in a large field between the technical site and the hamlet of Bassingbourn-North End. Dispersal B was located north and west of the bomb store. Dispersal C was next to the A14 north of the runways and Dispersal D was built in the grand avenue of Wimpole Park, the tree-lined entrance to Wimpole Hall across the A14 from the station. Bombers using this dispersal had to cross the road to marshal for take-off. Ultimately 35 "pan" hardstands and 16 loop hardstands were constructed, able to accommodate 67 bombers.

Bassingbourn made extensive use of camouflage to disguise the location of its runways. Prior to the building of the concrete runways, the strips were painted to blend them into the surrounding pattern of fields, lanes and drainage areas. After conversion to Class A standards, which required extensive clearing and grading of the airfield area, the areas between the runways were camouflaged to resemble agricultural crops.

== Royal Air Force use (1938–42) ==
Bassingbourn RAF Station Crest

The airfield was opened in March 1938, with the Hawker Hind light bombers of 104 and 108 Squadrons from RAF Hucknall and RAF Uxbridge moving in on 2 May 1938. In May–June 1938 the two squadrons re-equipped with Bristol Blenheim bombers. In May 1939, the two Bassingbourn-based squadrons were given the new task of converting aircrew from the Royal Air Force Volunteer Reserve onto the Blenheim, the two squadrons supplementing their Blenheims with Avro Anson trainers, and on 1 June 1939, both squadrons were designated Group Training Squadrons for 2 Group, RAF Bomber Command.

The outbreak of the Second World War in September 1939 saw the two squadrons transfer to 6 Group and move to RAF Bicester in mid-month, being replaced by 215 Squadron, the 3 Group training squadron, equipped with Vickers Wellingtons, by the end of the month. No. 35 Squadron, the 1 Group training squadron, equipped with Blenheims and Fairey Battles, was also based at Bassingbourn between December 1939 and February 1940. On 8 April 1940, No. 11 Operational Training Unit (OTU) was formed at Bassingbourn, absorbing the Station HQ and 215 Squadron. The new unit had an allocated strength of 54 Wellingtons and 11 Ansons, and used RAF Steeple Morden as a satellite airfield. From December 1941 to February 1942 the OTU operated from Steeple Morden and RAF Tempsford while runways were constructed at Bassingbourn.

The station was attacked on 28 May 1940 by an isolated German raider that dropped 10 bombs, and from March to August 1941, as the easternmost bomber OTU, came under fairly regular attack by German night intruder aircraft. Five Wellingtons of the OTU were shot down by intruders, and on 13 August 1941, a German aircraft dropped four bombs on the airfield, one of which hit a barrack block, killing 10.

On 31 May 1942 aircraft from Bassingbourn participated in the "Thousand Bomber" raid on Cologne. In order to raise this number, Bomber Command employed every aircraft capable of taking to the air, including 25 Wellington bombers from No. 11 OTU (12 of which flew from Bassingbourn, with the other 13 from Steeple Morden). Subsequently, aircraft from Bassingbourn took part in several more large raids until the end of September, with 11 OTU moving to RAF Westcott between 28 September and 2 October 1942.

== United States Army Air Forces use ==
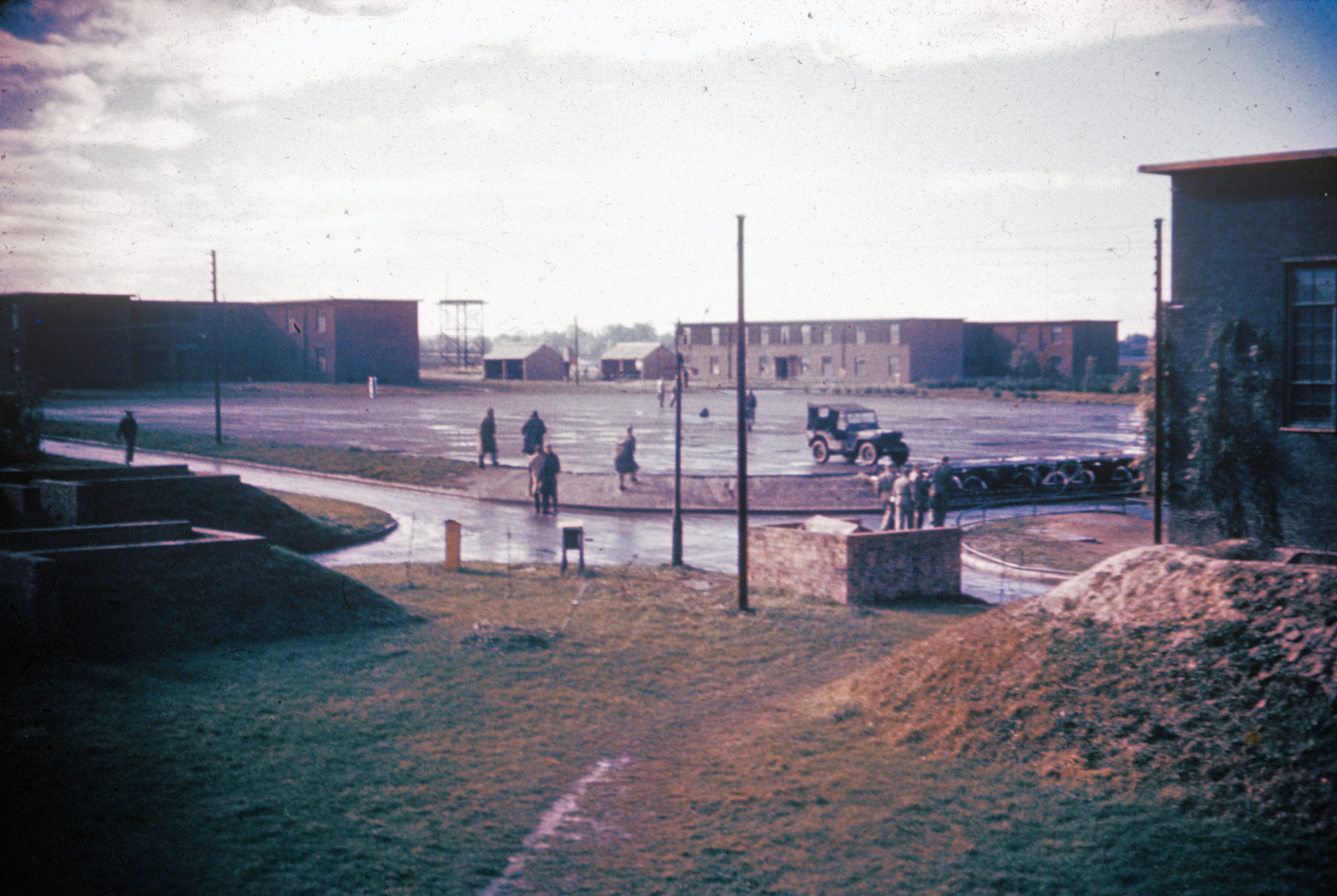
Personnel of the 91st Bomb Group on the parade ground at Bassingbourn

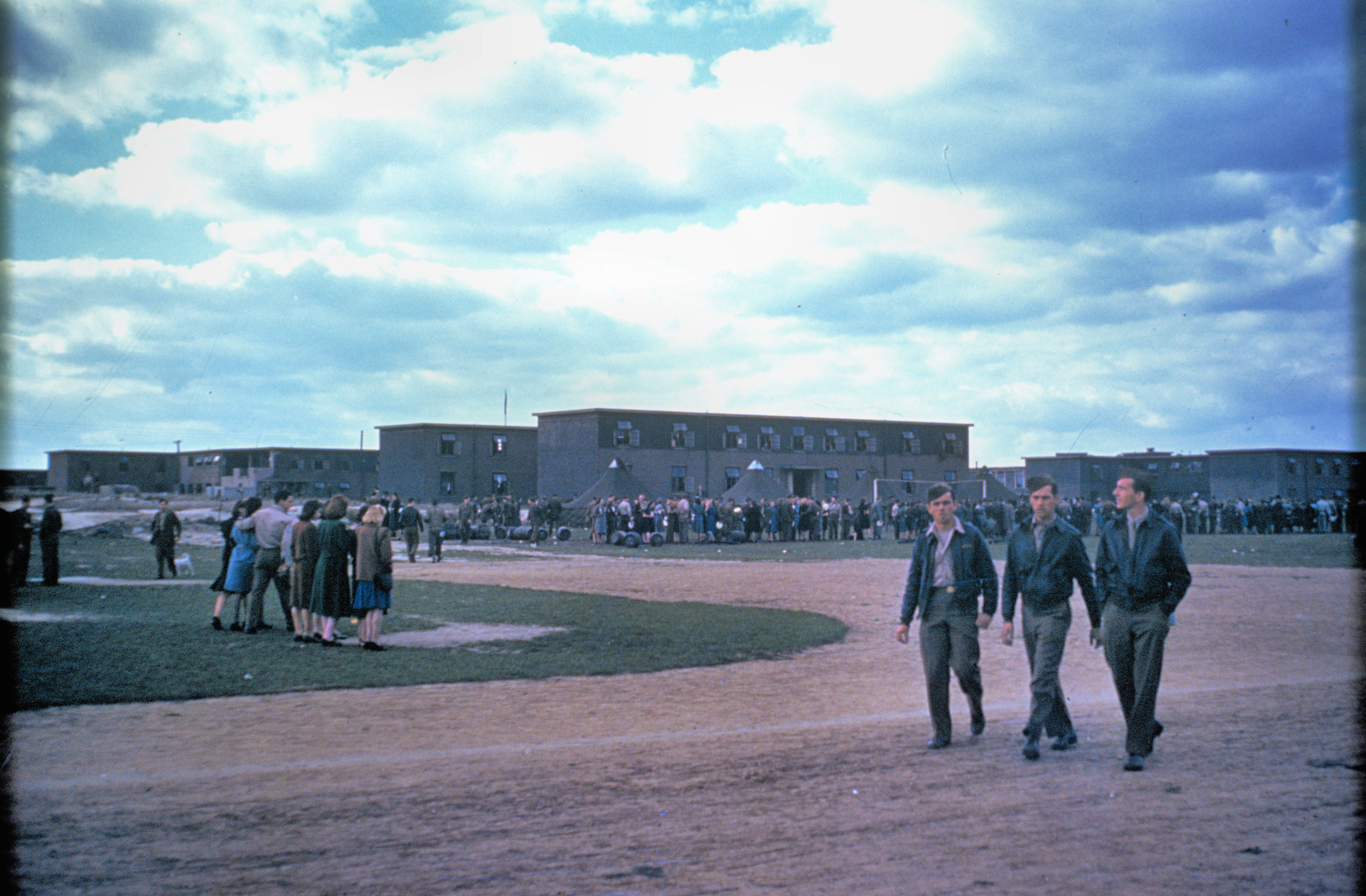
Personnel of the 91st Bomb Group at a Parade at Bassingbourn to celebrate their second year in the European Theatre of Operations, 17 September 1944.

Plans for locating United States Army Air Forces heavy bomber groups dated back to before America's entry into the war, when RAF Thurleigh was tentatively designated in November 1941. Initial concepts anticipated that 75 heavy bomb groups would eventually be based in East Anglia and the Huntingdon area in five bombardment wings (later termed air divisions), but the first plan on 24 March 1942, called for 45 groups, with four to be moved to the UK by June. This did not come to pass (of the four groups, only one eventually came to the UK, in 1944) but 75 fields were allocated by the Air Ministry on 10 August 1942 for VIII Bomber Command.

From 19 August 1942 to 25 June 1945, Bassingbourn served as headquarters for the 1st Combat Bombardment Wing of the 1st Bomb Division. It was assigned USAAF designation Station 121.

USAAF Station Units assigned to RAF Bassingbourn were:

- 441st Sub-Depot (VIII Air Force Service Command)
- 18th Weather Squadron
- 1st Station Complement Squadron

Regular Army Station Units included:

- 831st Engineer Aviation Battalion
- 204th Quartermaster Company
- 1696th Ordnance Supply & Maintenance Company
- 863rd Chemical Company (Air Operations)
- 982nd Military Police Company
- 985th Military Police Company
- 2024th Engineer Fire Fighting Platoon
- 206th Finance Section
- 3rd Mobile Training Unit
- 556th Army Postal Unit

=== 91st Bombardment Group (Heavy) ===
The 91st Bomb Group, equipped with Boeing B-17 Flying Fortress heavy bombers, moved into Bassingbourn on 14 October 1942. The group had originally been assigned to RAF Kimbolton in Huntingdonshire, but Kimbolton's runways were not strong enough to support B-17 operations, so the 91st moved into Bassingbourn, which as a pre-war RAF station, was relatively well appointed compared to war-built airfields, gaining the nickname "the country club".

The 91st BG was assigned to the 1st Combat Bombardment Wing, which was also based at Bassingbourn from September 1943. The group tail code (after June 1943) was a "Triangle A". Its operational squadrons and fuselage codes were:

- 322d Bombardment Squadron (LG)
- 323d Bombardment Squadron (OR)
- 324th Bombardment Squadron (DF)
- 401st Bombardment Squadron (LL)

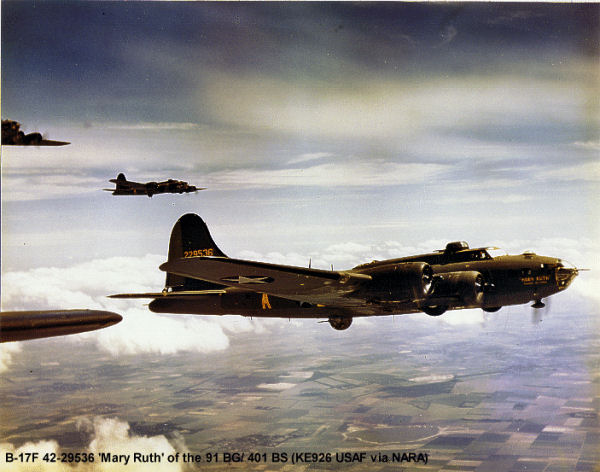
B-17F-60-BO Flying Fortress AAF Ser. No. 42-29536 Mary Ruth, Memories of Mobile, 401st Bomb Squadron, shot down by fighters over Hüls, Germany, 22 June 1943, with two killed and eight captured

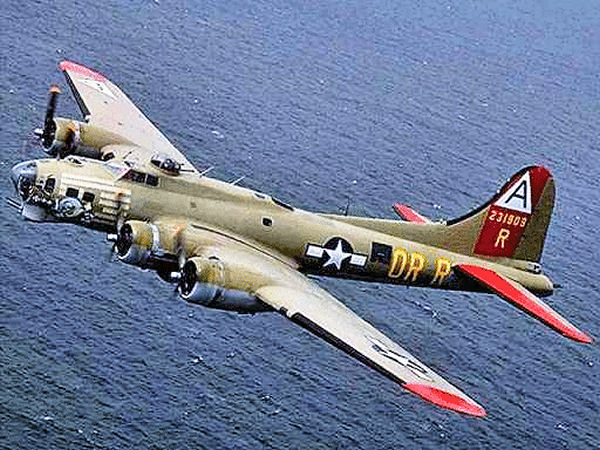
B-17G AAF Ser. No. 44-83575 restored to military configuration and flying as AAF Ser. No. 42-31909. A B-17G-30-BO Flying Fortress named Nine-O-Nine of the 323rd Bomb Squadron, one of two long-serving B-17s of the 91st BG. The original "Nine-O-Nine" was scrapped after the Second World War in Kingman, Arizona. B-17G 44-83575 was built too late for the war and was for a time used as a civilian fire bomber.

The airfield remained under RAF administration until 21 April 1943, becoming Army Air Force Station 121.

The 91st began combat operations from Bassingbourn on 7 November 1942, as one of the four "pioneer" B-17 groups. The group operated primarily as a strategic bombardment organization throughout the war.

The first eight months of operations concentrated against the German submarine campaign, attacking U-boat pens in French ports or construction yards in Germany in 28 of the first 48 missions flown. Secondary targets were Luftwaffe airfields, industrial targets, and marshalling yards.

The 91st BG received a Distinguished Unit Citation for bombing marshalling yards at Hamm on 4 March 1943 in spite of adverse weather and heavy enemy opposition. From the middle of 1943 until the war ended, the Group engaged chiefly in attacks on aircraft factories, aerodromes, and oil facilities. Specific targets included airfields at Villacoublay and Oldenburg, aircraft factories in Oranienburg and Brussels, chemical industries in Leverkusen and Peenemünde, ball-bearing plants in Schweinfurt and other industries in Ludwigshafen, Berlin, Frankfurt, and Wilhelmshaven.

On 11 January 1944 organisations of Eighth AF went into central Germany to attack vital aircraft factories. The 91st BG successfully bombed its targets in spite of bad weather, inadequate fighter cover and severe enemy attack, being awarded a second Distinguished Unit Citation for the performance.

Expanding its operations to include interdictory and support missions, the group contributed to the Battle of Normandy by bombing gun emplacements and troop concentrations near the beachhead area in June 1944 and aided the Saint-Lô breakout by attacking enemy troop positions on 24 and 25 July 1944. The 91st flew tactical bombing missions on the front line near Caen in August 1944 and attacked communications near the battle area during the Battle of the Bulge in December 1944 and January 1945. In support of Operation Varsity, the group assisted the push across the Rhine by striking airfields, bridges and railways near the front line in the spring of 1945.

The 91st Bomb Group continued combat operations until 25 April 1945, flying 340 missions. In terms of its casualties, 197 B-17s failed to return to Bassingbourn, the US Eighth Air Force's highest heavy bomber loss at any USAAF station in the UK.

After V-E Day the group helped to evacuate prisoners of war (POW) from German camps. During June and July 1945, the 91st BG withdrew from Bassingbourn and returned to the United States.

=== 94th Bombardment Group (Heavy) ===
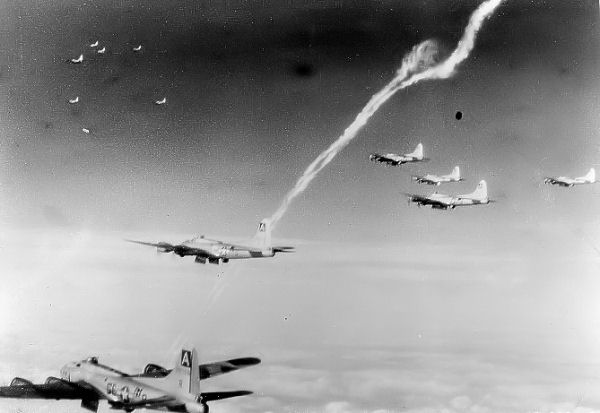
B-17s of the 410th Bomb Squadron on a mission over occupied Europe

VIII Bomber Command quadrupled in size from May 1943 to August to implement the Pointblank Directive. As part of this expansion, RAF Bassingbourn temporarily hosted the flying echelon of the new 94th Bombardment Group from April to May 1943. The 94th flew a few missions from Bassingbourn while under the tutelage of the 91st Bomb Group until moving to RAF Earls Colne on 12 May 1943.

At the same time, VIII Bomber Command proceeded with its plan to organise the groups into "combat wings" which in turn were organised into "bombardment wings" (later "divisions"). The first of these, the 101st Provisional Combat Bomb Wing, commanded by Brigadier General Frank A. Armstrong Jr., set up its headquarters at Bassingbourn on 16 April 1943. In August Brig. Gen. Robert B. Williams succeeded to command of the 101st PCBW, followed by Brig. Gen. William M. Gross when the organisation was then redesignated 1st Combat Bombing Wing on 13 September 1943.

=== Hollywood at Bassingbourn ===
During 1943 RAF Bassingbourn was the focus of a number of media events. The station and its locality were featured in the documentary film Memphis Belle: A Story of a Flying Fortress. One of the Memphis Belle's propellers stands to greet you at the gatehouse on entering the Army Training Regiment. The airfield and group were also the subject of a series of newspaper articles written by John Steinbeck during the spring and summer of 1943. Captain Clark Gable had temporary duty at Bassingbourn while producing a gunnery film for the USAAF. It also served as the location for the fictional "28th Bomb Group" in the 1950 Humphrey Bogart film Chain Lightning. Away from Hollywood, but still in the movies, RAF Bassingbourn was also the setting for the Airfield-based shots in the 1955 film, The Dambusters, featuring Richard Todd and Michael Redgrave. In 1986/7 Stanley Kubrick used the barracks as a lot (Parris Island) in his film, Full Metal Jacket. The fake palm trees were there for a few years afterwards.

== Postwar Use ==
=== RAF Transport Command ===
The RAF resumed occupation of Bassingbourn on 26 June 1945, the airfield was officially returned on 10 July 1945. The station became one of the main airfields for long-range transport aircraft. In 1948 and 1949 Avro York, Avro Lancaster and Douglas Dakota aircraft from the base took part in the Berlin Airlift, a massive operation transporting essential commodities to the beleaguered city.

=== United States Air Forces in Europe ===
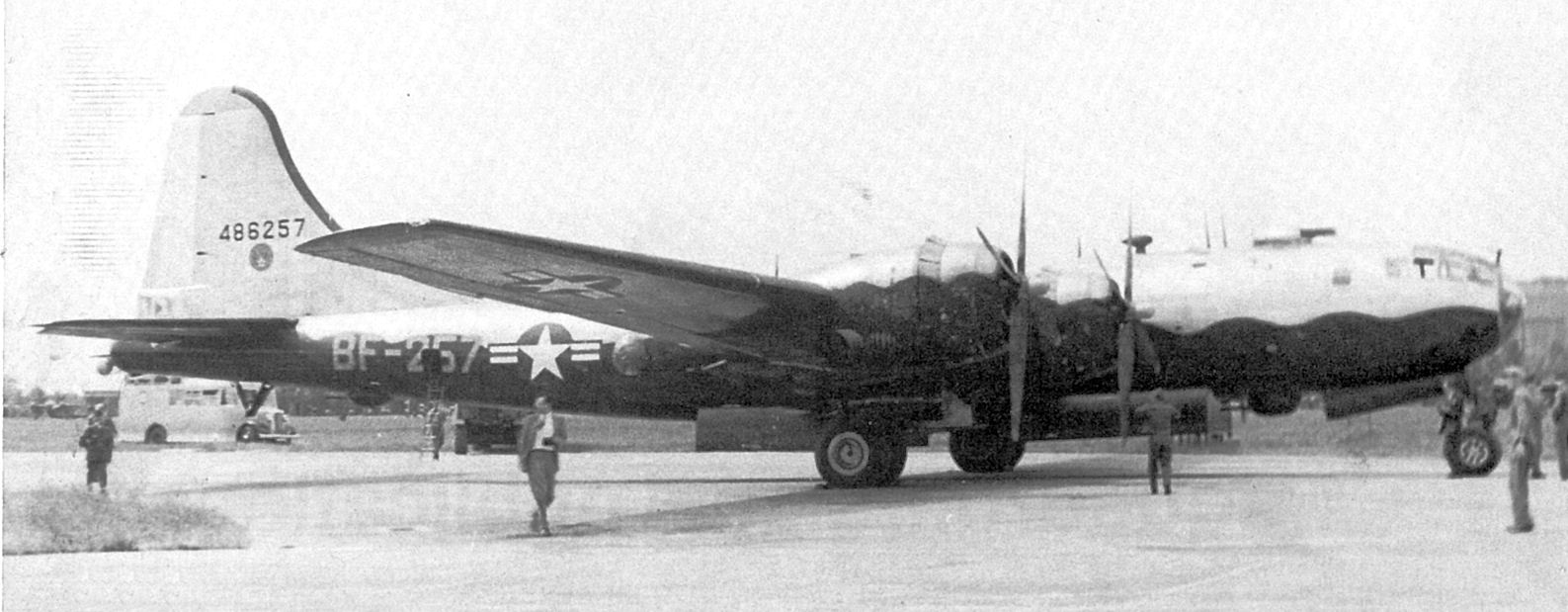
Martin-Omaha B-29 Superfortress 44–86257, assigned to the 341st Bombardment Squadron, 97th Bombardment Group. Shown deployed to Bassingborn during 1950

During the late 1940s, the United States Air Force began rotating deployments of Strategic Air Command (SAC) Boeing B-29 and Boeing B-50 Superfortresses squadrons to the United Kingdom as "Show of Force" deployments.

With the Soviet blockade of Berlin in 1948 and the subsequent Berlin Airlift, these aircraft began regular deployments to the United Kingdom. These deployments were designed to send a message to the Soviet Union that despite the Berlin Airlift and Korean War, the United States was prepared to respond with atomic weapons to any Soviet aggression in Western Europe. Besides Bassingborn, SAC deployed squadrons of bombers to RAF Lakenheath and RAF Marham in Norfolk.

Jurisdiction of Bassingbourn remained with the Royal Air Force. The United States Air Forces in Europe (USAFE) 7516th Air Support Squadron, 3909th Air Base Group stationed at RAF South Ruislip provided logistical support for these squadrons while in the UK. These deployments were of a brief nature, beginning in August 1950 and ending in May 1951. It is unknown if any United States atomic weapons were ever deployed to the United Kingdom.

=== RAF Bomber Command ===
In February 1952, RAF Bassingbourn received its first allocation of English Electric Canberra bombers and the first jet bomber operational conversion unit (OCU) in the world, No. 231 Operational Conversion Unit RAF, began operations. Canberras operated from Bassingbourn for 17 years and one of the aircraft is on static display in the Barracks. Thereafter 231 OCU was moved elsewhere. From 1963 to 1969 the Joint School of Photographic Interpretation was also located there.

On 29 August 1969, the last RAF Commanding Officer, Squadron Leader A.M. McGregor MBE, turned over the station to the British Army as Bassingbourn Barracks.

Since approximately 1970 the site has retained its RAF links by being the home of 2484 (Bassingbourn) Squadron Air Training Corps.

== British Army use ==
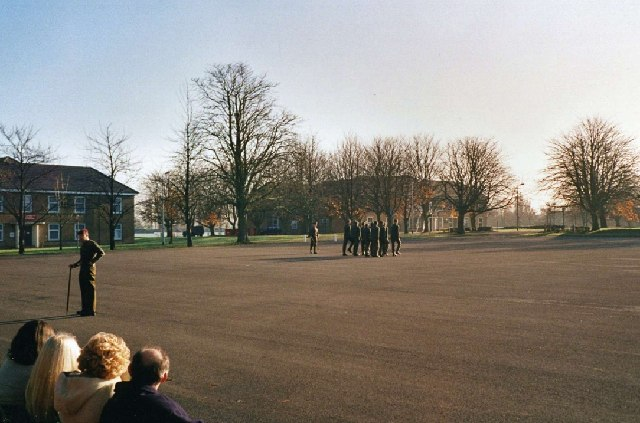
A passing-out parade at Bassingbourn Barracks

The former RAF Bassingbourn station was established as Bassingbourn Barracks in January 1970, as the new depot for the Queen's Division. The depot was responsible for training recruits undergoing their basic training before joining a regular battalion. In 1993 the Barracks were re-designated the home of the Army Training Regiment, Bassingbourn and remained as such for nearly 20 years. Bassingbourn Barracks closed as an army training location in August 2012, and re-opened in December 2018 as home to the Mission Training and Mobilisation Centre.

== Units Assigned ==
Royal Air Force

- 104 Squadron (2 May 1938 – 17 Sep 1939)
- 108 Squadron (2 May 1938 – 18 Sep 1939)
- 215 Squadron (24 Sep 1939 – 8 Apr 1940, 18–22 May 1940)
- 35 Squadron (7 Dec 1939 – 1 Feb 1940)
- 732 Naval Air Squadron (19 Dec 1941 – 1 Feb 1942)?
- 422 Squadron (25 Jul - 4 Sep 1945)
- 423 Squadron (8 Aug - 4 Sep 1945)
- 466 Squadron (6 Sep - 26 Oct 1945)
- 102 Squadron (8 Sep 1945 – 15 Feb 1946)
- 24 Squadron (25 Feb 1946 – 8 Jun 1949)
- 40 Squadron (25 Jun 1949 – 15 Mar 1950)
- 51 Squadron (25 Jun 1949 – 30 Oct 1950)
- 59 Squadron (25 Jun 1949 – 30 Oct 1950)
- 237 Operational Conversion Unit (3 Oct - 1 Dec 1951)
- 231 Operational Conversion Unit (1 Dec 1951 – 19 May 1969)
- 204 Advanced Flying School (13 - 20 Feb 1952)
- No. 2732 Squadron RAF Regiment
- No. 1 Engine Control Demonstration Unit RAF (14 Sept - 2 Oct 1942)
- No. 5 Service Flying Training School RAF (10 - 18 Feb 1941)
- No. 11 Operational Training Unit RAF (8 Apr 1940 - 18 Sept 1945)
- No. 21 Squadron RAF
- No. 98 Squadron RAF
- No. 1359 (VIP Transport) Flight RAF (25 Feb 1946 - 30 June 1946)
- No. 1446 (Ferry Training) Flight RAF (23 March - 18 May 1942)
- No. 1555 (Radio Aids Training) Flight RAF (31 Oct 1946 - 19 Mar 1947)

United States Army Air Forces

- 91st Bombardment Group (14 Oct 1942 – 23 Jun 1945)
- 94th Bombardment Group (Apr - 27 May 1943)

United States Air Force

- 353d Bombardment Squadron, 301st Bombardment Group (25 Aug 1950 - Jan 1951)
- 341st Bombardment Squadron, 97th Bombardment Group (4 Dec 1950 - Feb 1951)
- 7516th Air Support Squadron (11 Dec 1950 – 16 May 1951)
- 38th Strategic Reconnaissance Squadron, 55th Strategic Reconnaissance Wing (Jan - May 1951)
- 96th Bombardment Squadron, 2d Bombardment Group USAF (May - Sep 1951)

== See also ==
- Strategic Air Command in the United Kingdom
- List of former Royal Air Force stations
- List of British Army Barracks
