= RAF Wigsley =

Former Royal Air Force station in Nottinghamshire, England

RAF Wigsley
- Wigsley, Nottinghamshire in England
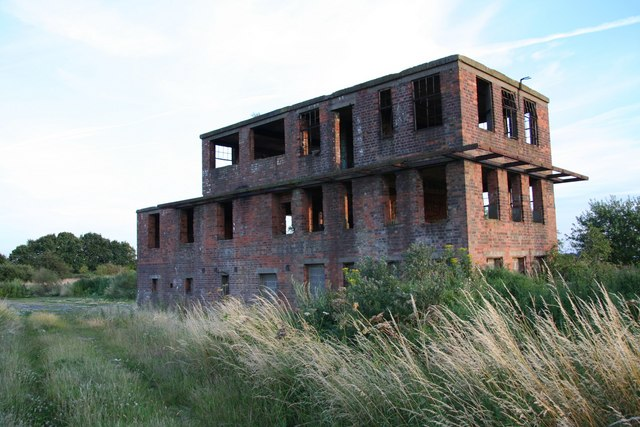
- RAF Wigsley watchtower

Site information
- Type: Satellite station
- Code: UG
- Owner: Air Ministry
- Operator: Royal Air Force
- Controlled by: RAF Bomber Command * No. 5 Group RAF * No. 7 (HCU) Group RAF; RAF Flying Training Command * No. 21 Group RAF

Location
- Shown within Nottinghamshire RAF Wigsley (the United Kingdom)
- Coordinates: 53°12′53″N 000°43′42″W

Site history
- Built: 1941/42
- Built by: Sir Robert McAlpine & Sons Ltd
- In use: February 1942 - July 1958
- Battles/wars: European theatre of World War II

Airfield information
- Elevation: 7 metres (23 ft) AMSL
Runways
Direction	Length and surface
00/00	Concrete
00/00	Concrete
00/00	Concrete

Royal Air Force Wigsley, also known as RAF Wigsley, is a former Royal Air Force satellite station located 7.3 miles (11.7 km) east of Tuxford, Nottinghamshire and 7.6 miles (12.2 km) west of Lincoln, Lincolnshire, England.

== History ==
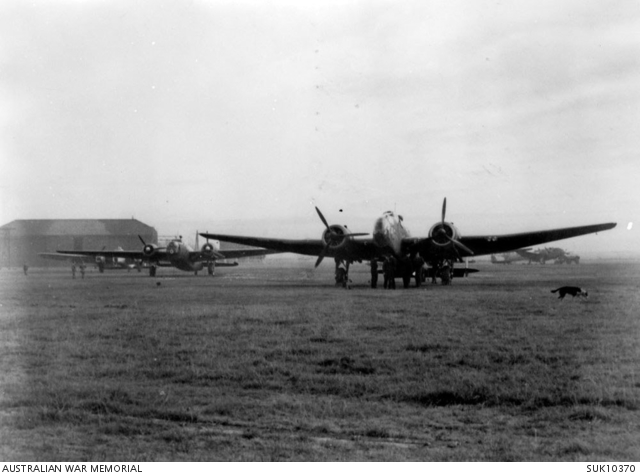
A RAAF Hampden of No. 455 Squadron at RAF Wigsley, Nottinghamshire, circa 1942

- Detachment from No. 14 (Pilots) Advanced Flying Unit RAF between April and May 1942
- No. 28 Air Crew Holding Unit RAF between September 1945 and January 1946
- Satellite of No. 201 Advanced Flying School RAF between 1947 and 1954
- Satellite of No. 204 Advanced Flying School RAF between 1950 and 1952
- No. 455 Squadron RAAF with the Handley Page Hampden between 8 February and 28 April 1942
- No. 1654 Conversion Unit RAF between June and October 1942 became No. 1654 Heavy Conversion Unit RAF between October 1942 and September 1945
- Relief Landing Ground for No. 8 Flying Training School RAF between August 1955 and August 1959
- No. 50 Conversion Flight during August 1942
- No. 83 Conversion Flight during August 1942
- No. 2776 Squadron RAF Regiment]
- Relief Landing Ground for the RAF College during 1955

== Current use ==
The site is now used as farmland.

== See also ==
- List of former Royal Air Force stations
