= No. 231 Operational Conversion Unit RAF =

Former Royal Air Force operational conversion unit

No. 231 Operational Conversion Unit RAF
- Active: 15 March 1947 - 4 December 1949; 1 December 1951 - 23 April 1993
- Disbanded: 23 April 1993
- Country: United Kingdom
- Branch: Royal Air Force
- Type: Operational conversion unit
- Role: Bomber training
- Last home: RAF Wyton

No. 231 Operational Conversion Unit was a Royal Air Force Operational conversion unit that disbanded during April 1993. It was active twice, initially between March 1947 and December 1949, before reforming in December 1951.

== Operational history ==
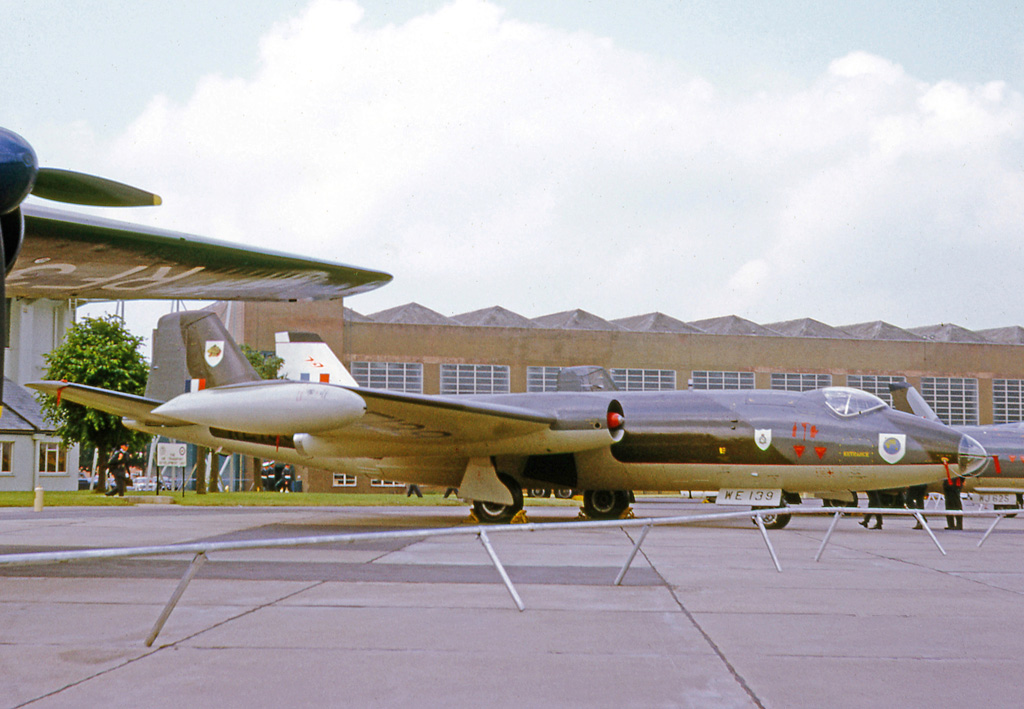
EE Canberra PR.3 of 231 OCU in 1968

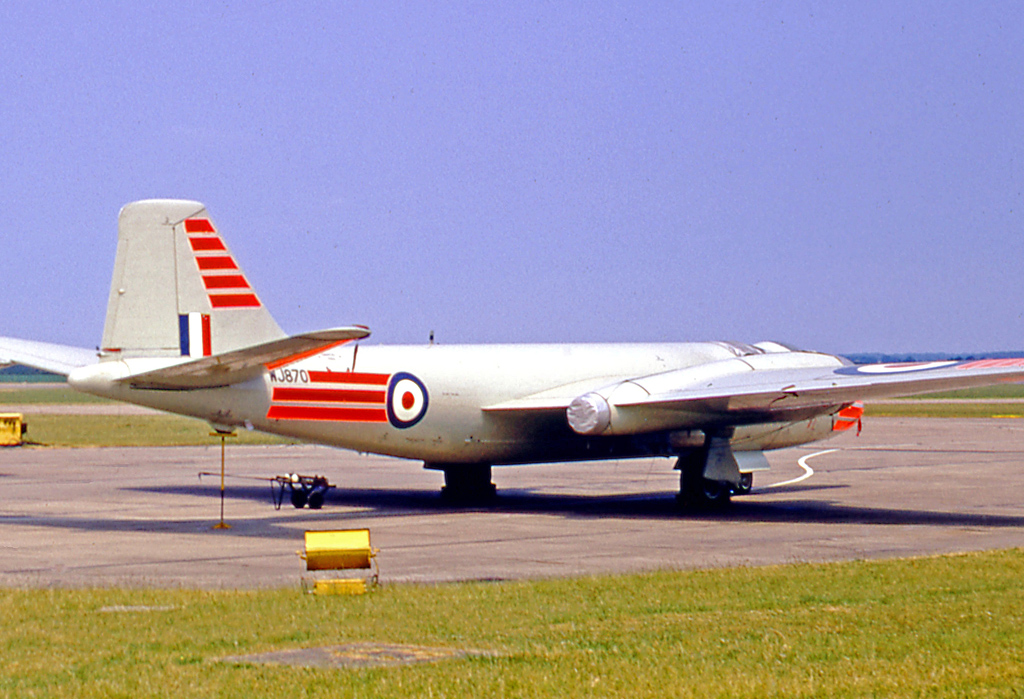
English Electric CanberraT.4 of 231 OCU at its RAF Cottesmore base in 1970

231 OCU first formed in the aftermath of the Second World War on 15 March 1947 at RAF Coningsby. Initially the OCU was formed from a nucleus provided by No. 16 OTU and was tasked with training crews of the "wooden wonder", the de Havilland Mosquito, in the light bomber and photo reconnaissance roles. Initial operational equipment was provided by Mosquito III and Mosquito B.XVI aircraft. In this role the unit lasted nearly three years before disbanding on 4 December 1949.

In keeping with its previous role when the OCU reformed on 1 December 1951 it was to train light bomber aircrews by redesignating 237 OCU. The aircraft used during the rest of the unit's operational service was the English Electric Canberra, a British first-generation, jet-powered medium bomber and most operational versions of that versatile aircraft were flown by the unit. It was reformed at RAF Bassingbourn in Cambridgeshire and it moved around various stations, including RAF Bassingbourn, RAF Cottesmore Rutland and RAF Marham in Norfolk, during its operational existence. It was redesignated the Canberra Standardisation Training Flight on 15 December 1990, but reverted to 231 OCU on 13 May 1991.

'D' Squadron was previously No. 204 Advanced Flying School at Bassingbourn which was disbanded on 13 February 1952. 204 AFS was previously No. 204 Crew Training Unit which was formed on 28 February 1947 at Cottesmore by redesignating an element of No. 16 OTU. 204 CTU was disbanded on 15 March 1947 at Cottesmore.

== Disbandment ==
231 OCU was disbanded at RAF Wyton, Huntingdonshire on 23 April 1993, by which time it had trained for a variety of roles more than 8,000 aircrew from 17 different nations.

== See also ==
- List of conversion units of the Royal Air Force
