= RAF Shrewton =

Former RAF satellite airfield

RAF Shrewton
- Shrewton, Wiltshire in England

Site information
- Owner: Air Ministry
- Operator: Royal Air Force
- Controlled by: RAF Flying Training Command

Location
- Shown within Wiltshire
- Coordinates: 51°12′41″N 1°53′35″W

Site history
- Built: 1940
- In use: 1940-1946
- Battles/wars: Second World War

Royal Air Force Shrewton or more simply RAF Shrewton is a former Royal Air Force satellite airfield located in Wiltshire, England.

The following units were here at some point:

- No. 1 Service Flying Training School RAF
- No. 15 Service Flying Training School RAF
- No. 43 Operational Training Unit RAF
- No. 225 Squadron RAF
- Glider Exercise Squadron RAF
- Heavy Glider Conversion Unit RAF
- Operational and Refresher Training Unit RAF

== Current use ==
The site is currently farmland.
