= No. 240 Operational Conversion Unit RAF =

No. 240 Operational Conversion Unit RAFF
- Active: 5 January 1948 - 16 April 1951; 29 December 1971 - 1 October 1993; Previous units: June 1942 (296B Sqn) - Jan 1948
- Country: United Kingdom
- Branch: Royal Air Force
- Role: Transport aircraft training

No. 240 Operational Conversion Unit RAF is a former Royal Air Force Operational conversion unit which was formed by a series of mergers, it then became No. 27 Squadron RAF in 1993. The unit was initially formed in 1948 for transport aircraft training, and was reformed in 1971 for helicopter training.

== 240 OCU ==
240 OCU was formed on 5 January 1948 within No. 4 Group RAF using Douglas Dakota II & IV's by merging 1333 Transport Support Training Unit and 1382 (Transport) Conversion Unit at RAF North Luffenham. The unit was moved to No. 38 Group RAF on 2 February 1948 with a detachment at Wunstorf Air Base during June 1948. From October 1948 Avro Anson's were added with Vickers Valetta's and de Havilland Devons being added from December 1948. The unit moved to RAF Dishforth on 28 March 1951 and it was disbanded for the first time on 16 April 1951 and merged with 241 OCU to become 242 OCU.

240 OCU was then reformed 20 years later for helicopter training at RAF Odiham still under No. 38 Group RAF using Westland Wessex HC.2's, Westland Puma HC.1's and Boeing CH-47 Chinook HC.1's. The training of Wessex crews moved to the Wessex Training Flight RAF at RAF Benson from 3 November 1980 (until 1982 when this new unit was disbanded). 240 OCU was disbanded on 1 October 1993.

Air Training Squadron

The Air Training Squadron was formed at RAF Odiham on 1 May 1971 using Westland Wessex's and Westland Puma's until 1 January 1972, when it was used to reform 240 OCU.

Helicopter Operational Conversion Unit

The Helicopter Operational Conversion Unit was formed at RAF Odiham on 1 July 1967 with the Wessex and Puma until 1 May 1971 when it became the ATS.

Short Range Conversion Unit

The Short Range Conversion Unit was formed on 5 August 1964 at RAF Odiham and used both fixed wing and rotary aircraft such as the Scottish Aviation Twin Pioneer and the Wessex. It was disbanded on 1 July 1967 to become the HOCU.

Twin Pioneer Conversion Unit

The Twin Pioneer Conversion Unit was formed on 1 January 1963 at RAF Odiham by redesignating the Twin Pioneer element from No. 230 Squadron RAF. It was disbanded on 5 August 1964 still at Odiham to become the SRCU.

== Previous identities ==
=== No. 1333 Transport Support Training Unit ===
1333 Transport Support Training Unit RAF was previously No. 1333 (Transport Support) Conversion Unit RAF, that unit was previously 107 OTU. 133 (TS) CU was formed on 12 March 1945 at Leicester East, it was similar to 107 OTU and renamed to 1333 TSTU on 6 July 1946. 1333 TSTU was disbanded on 5 January 1948 to become 240 OCU.

No. 107 OTU

107 OTU was formed at RAF Leicester East on 3 May 1944 and primarily used Douglas Dakota's to train crews. It was disbanded on 12 March 1945 to become 1333 (TS) CU.

No. 1385 (Heavy Transport Support) Conversion Unit

1385 (HTS)CU was formed at RAF Wethersfield on 1 April 1946 by redesignating the Operational and Refresher Training Unit. The conversion used transport aircraft and gliders to train transport crews for operational missions. It was disbanded on 6 June 1946 and absorbed by the 1333 (Transport Support) Conversion Unit.

Operational and Refresher Training Unit

ORTU was formed at RAF Thruxton on 1 December 1943 by redesignating the Glider Pilot Exercise Unit which used a variety of aircraft including Supermarine Spitfire's, de Havilland Tiger Moth's and Waco Hadrian gliders to train glider and transport pilots. It was disbanded on 1 April 1946.

Glider Pilot Exercise Unit

GPEU was formed at Netheravon Airfield on 12 August 1942 by redesignating No. 296B Squadron, it operated Hawker Hart's, Hawker Hind's and Airspeed Horsa's amongst others until 1 December 1943 when it was disbanded to become the ORTU.

=== No. 1382 (Transport) Conversion Unit ===
1382 (Transport) Conversion Unit was previously 108 OTU, it was formed at RAF Wymeswold on 10 August 1945 and was similar to the previous unit. It disbanded on 5 January 1948 to become 240 OCU.

No. 108 OTU

108 OTU was formed at RAF Wymeswold on 10 October 1944, it was used Miles Magister's and Douglas Dakota's to train personnel until 10 August 1945 when it was disbanded to become 1382 (T)CU.

== See also ==
- List of conversion units of the Royal Air Force
- List of Royal Air Force Operational Training Units
