= RAF Leicester East =

Former Royal Air Force station in England

RAF Leicester East
- Stoughton, Leicestershire in England
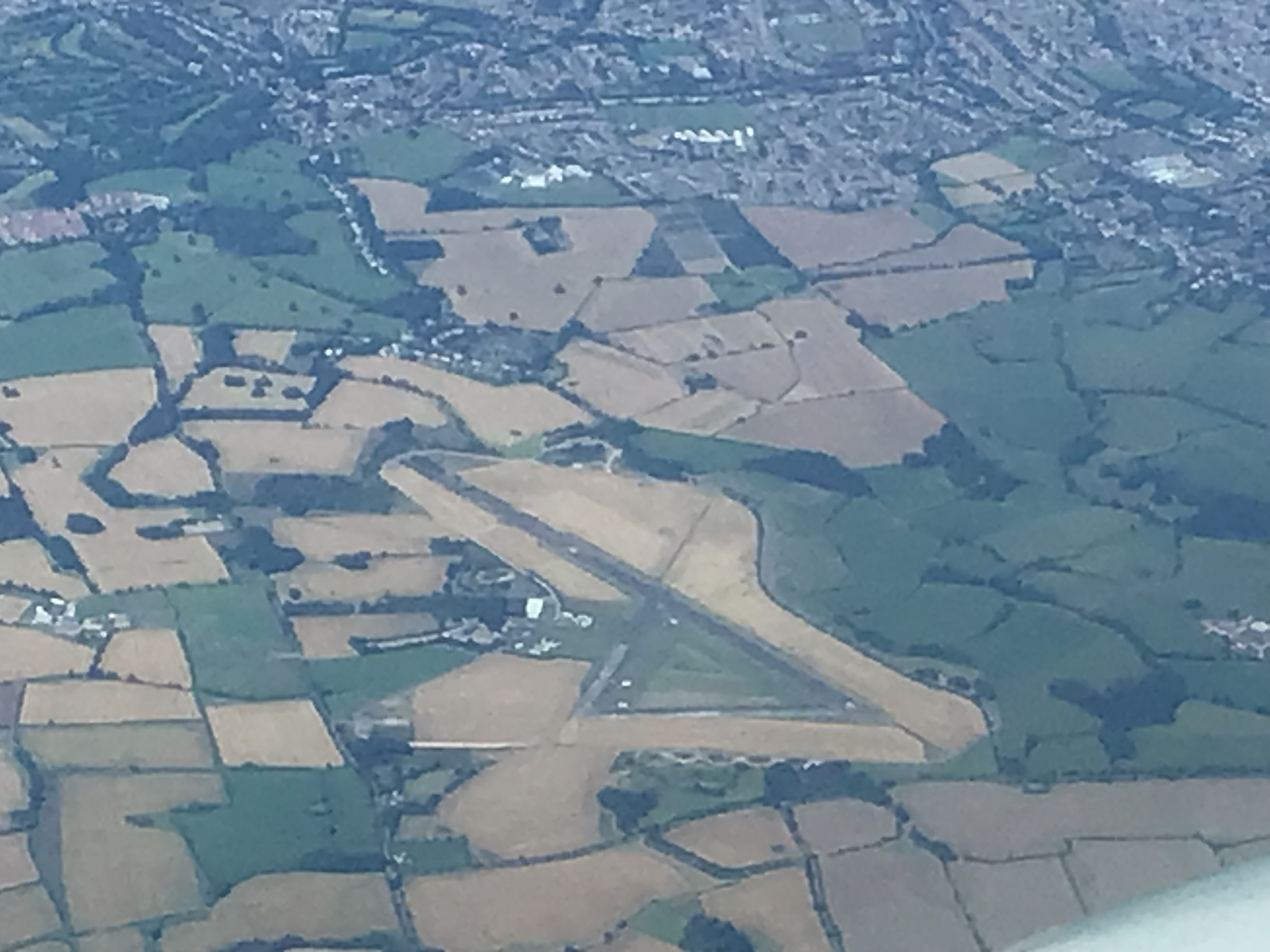
- RAF Leicester East in 2024

Site information
- Type: Royal Air Force station
- Code: LE
- Owner: Air Ministry
- Operator: Royal Air Force
- Controlled by: RAF Fighter Command; 1943-44 * No. 38 Group RAF; RAF Transport Command; 1944-

Location
- Shown within Leicestershire RAF Leicester East (the United Kingdom)
- Coordinates: 52°36′28″N 001°01′55″W

Site history
- Built: 1942/43
- In use: October 1943 - December 1947
- Battles/wars: European theatre of World War II

Airfield information
- Identifiers: ICAO: EGBG
- Elevation: 469 feet (143 m) AMSL
Runways
Direction	Length and surface
04/22	490 metres (1,608 ft) Asphalt
06/24	340 metres (1,115 ft) Grass
10/28	935 metres (3,068 ft) Asphalt
15/33	495 metres (1,624 ft) Asphalt
16/34	418 metres (1,371 ft) Grass
- Sources: UK AIP at NATS

Royal Air Force Leicester East, more commonly known as RAF Leicester East (ICAO: EGBG), is a former Royal Air Force station, near the village of Stoughton, 4 NM (7.4 km; 4.6 mi) east southeast of Leicester, Leicestershire, England.

It was constructed in 1942 and formally opened in October 1943. The airfield is now Leicester Airport.

== History ==
The following units were posted to the airfield at some point:

- No. 190 Squadron RAF (1944), flying Short Stirling IV
- No. 196 Squadron RAF (1943–44), flying Short Stirling III & IV
- No. 620 Squadron RAF (1943–44), flying Short Stirling III
- No. 93 Group Screened Pilots School
- No. 107 (Transport) Operational Training Unit RAF
- No. 216 Maintenance Unit RAF (MU)
- No. 255 MU
- No. 1333 (Transport Support) Conversion Unit RAF

On 10 August 1944, at the formation of the First Allied Airborne Army, General Eisenhower visited RAF Leicester East to review 12,000 troops of the 82nd Airborne Division who were camped nearby and at other locations around Leicestershire and Nottinghamshire. He was accompanied by Brigadier General James M. Gavin, who had recently taken Command of the Division, Major General Matthew Ridgway, who had recently taken Command of the XVIIIth Airborne Corps and Lieutenant General Lewis H. Brereton who would take Command of the First Allied Airborne Army, having previously Commanded the US 9th Army Air Force. Also present were small contingents of the five Groups that made up the US 52nd Troop Carrier Wing, the Wing mostly responsible for delivering the 82nd Airborne Division to combat in WWII.

On 19 February 1945, a Dakota of No. 107 OTU returning to Leicester East with personnel who had attended training at RAF Zeals, Wiltshire, crashed soon after taking off with the loss of 21 RAF, RAAF and RCAF lives.

In March 1945 all operational military aircraft left Leicester East, and the airfield was placed on Care and Maintenance until its closure on 31 December 1947.

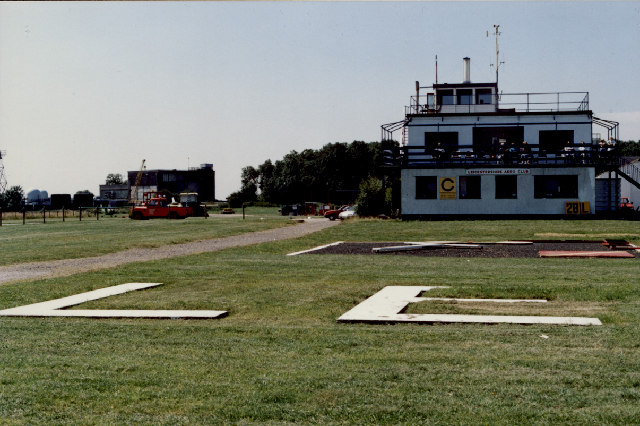
Leicester Airport Control Tower - geograph.org.uk - 119520

== Current use ==
Today, the former RAF Leicester East is now known as Leicester Airport, and was previously known as Stoughton Aerodrome.

The airfield, control tower, and other smaller buildings are now used by the Leicestershire Aero Club.

== See also ==
- List of former Royal Air Force stations
