= No. 237 Operational Conversion Unit RAF =

Former Operational Conversion Unit of the Royal Air Force

No. 237 Operational Conversion Unit RAF No. 237 (Photographic Reconnaissance) Operational Conversion Unit RAF
- Active: 31 July 1947 - 1 December 1951; 23 October 1956 - 21 January 1958; 1 March 1971 - 1 October 1991
- Country: United Kingdom
- Branch: Royal Air Force
- Type: Operational conversion unit
- Role: Reconnaissance pilot training
- Last home: RAF Lossiemouth

No. 237 Operational Conversion Unit was a Royal Air Force Operational conversion unit.

== Operational history ==
- First formation: 31 July 1947 - 1 December 1951
- Second formation: 23 October 1956 - 21 January 1958
- Third formation: 1 March 1971 - 1 October 1991

== Future identity ==
Buccaneer Training Flight RAF within No. 208 Squadron RAF at RAF Lossiemouth (1 October 1991 - 1992)

== Previous identities ==
- No. 8 OTU No. 8 Operational Training Unit RAF (18 May 1942 - 31 July 1947)
  - PRU Conversion Flight of No. 3 School of General Reconnaissance RAF (February 1942 - 13 May 1942)
    - No. 3 School of General Reconnaissance RAF (16 December 1940 - 1 May 1946)
      - No. 2 School of General Reconnaissance RAF (28 May 1940 - 16 December 1940)
        - No. 1 School of General Reconnaissance RAF (19 June 1940 - 30 September 1940)
    - School of General Reconnaissance RAF (4 April 1938 - 19 June 1940 & 1 March 1946 - 5 September 1947)
  - K Flight of No. 1 Photographic Reconnaissance Unit RAF (23 January 1942 - 1 August 1942)

== See also ==
- List of conversion units of the Royal Air Force
