= No. 230 Operational Conversion Unit RAF =

Royal Air Force conversion unit from 1947 to 1981

No. 230 (Heavy Bomber) Operational Conversion Unit RAF No. 230 Operational Conversion Unit RAF

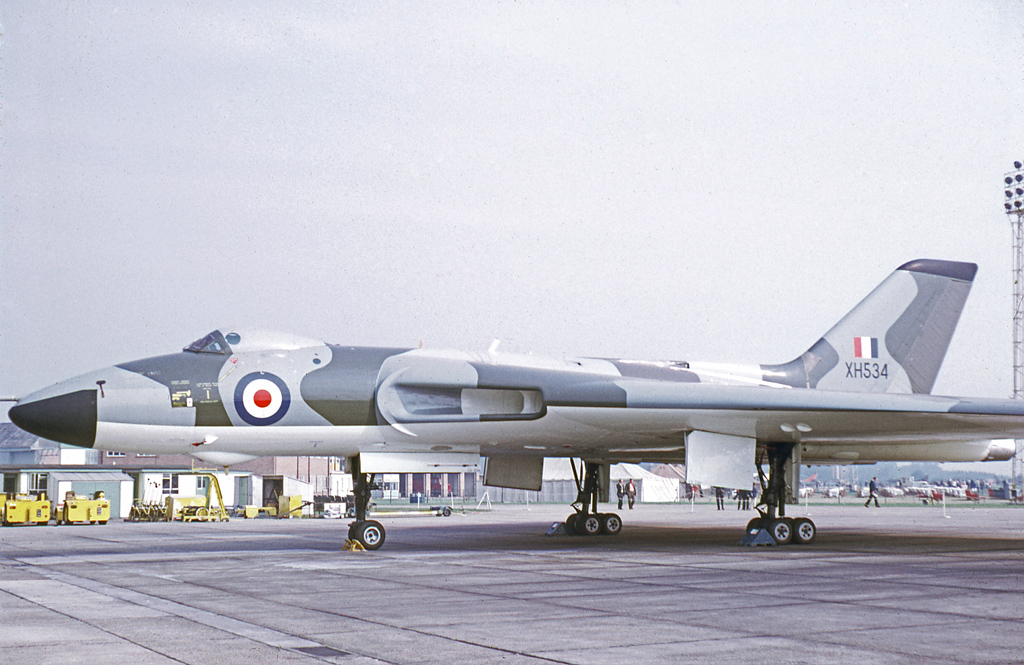
- Avro Vulcan B.2 of 230 OCU in 1971
- Active: 1947-1981
- Country: United Kingdom
- Branch: Royal Air Force
- Type: Conversion Unit
- Role: Bomber training
- Last base: RAF Scampton

No. 230 Operational Conversion Unit (OCU) was first created on 15 March 1947 at RAF Lindholme, by re-designation of No. 1653 Heavy Conversion Unit RAF, to convert crews onto the Avro Lancaster, Avro Lincoln and de Havilland Mosquito bombers. This unit was disbanded on 15 August 1952 to become the Reserve Training Squadron RAF. Re-formed again at RAF Upwood, from the Lincoln Conversion Flight RAF, 230 OCU trained Lincoln bomber crews until disbanded on 1 February 1955, reverting to Lincoln Conversion Flight.

Re-formed yet again on 31 May 1956 at RAF Waddington, 230 OCU thereafter trained crews for the Avro Vulcan, moving to RAF Finningley in 1961 and to RAF Scampton in 1969, remaining there until it was disbanded in 1981.

Between 1974 and 1977 it had the Hastings Radar Flight attached, which was previously the Strike Command Bombing School, before that the Bomber Command Bombing School.

== See also ==
- List of conversion units of the Royal Air Force
