= RAF North Luffenham =

Former RAF base in Rutland, England

RAF North Luffenham
- Edith Weston, Rutland in England
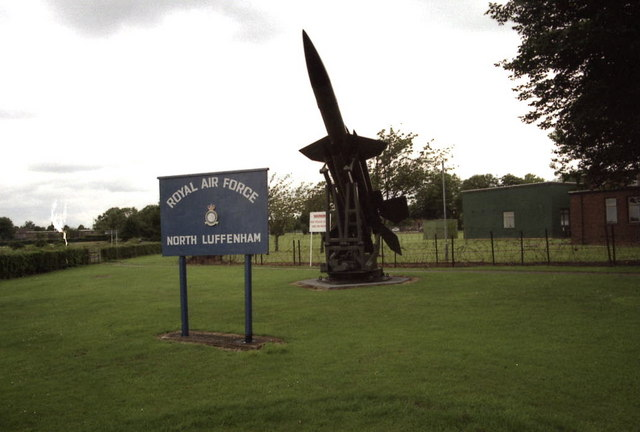
- The station gate guardian, a Bloodhound surface-to-air missile during 1997.

- Station Badge

Site information
- Type: Royal Air Force flying and missile station
- Owner: Ministry of Defence
- Operator: Royal Air Force; Royal Canadian Air Force
- Controlled by: RAF Bomber Command
- Condition: Closed

Location
- Location in Rutland RAF North Luffenham (the United Kingdom)
- Coordinates: 52°37′56″N 000°36′38″W
- Grid reference: SK940050
- Area: 292 hectares

Site history
- Built: 1940
- In use: January 1941 –23 October 1997
- Fate: Transferred to the British Army and became St George's Barracks.

Airfield information
Runways
Direction	Length and surface
03/21	1,315 metres (4,314 ft) Concrete
06/24	1,858 metres (6,096 ft) Concrete
12/30	1,200 metres (3,937 ft) Concrete

Royal Air Force North Luffenham or more simply RAF North Luffenham is a former Royal Air Force station in Rutland, England. It is near to the villages of Edith Weston and North Luffenham.

== History ==
=== Second World War ===
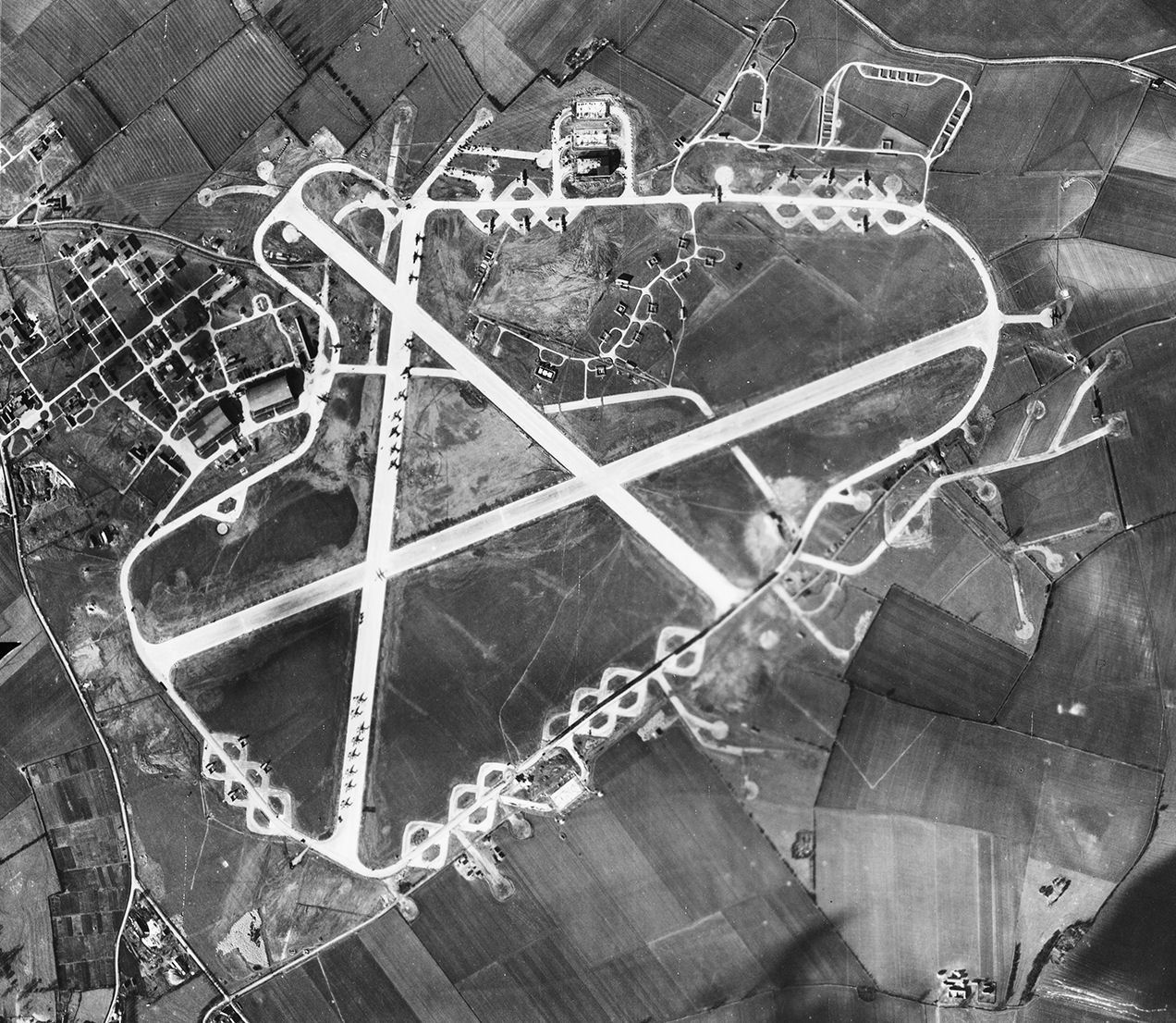
Aerial photograph of the airfield, 2 March 1944. The technical site with two T2 hangars are at the left (west). There are three more T2 hangars and the bomb dump north of the perimeter track. A large number of aircraft are parked on the north/south crosswind runway and on the hardstand loops around the perimeter track

The station was built as a training airfield, opening in 1940. It was later taken over by 5 Group of RAF Bomber Command as a heavy bomber base, and was expanded by the building of concrete runways later in the war.

=== Post war ===
In 1951, the station was transferred to the Royal Canadian Air Force to become the temporary home of 1 Fighter Wing, the first Canadian NATO base in Europe. 439 Combat Support Squadron arrived in late May 1952, the first Canadian jet squadron to cross the Atlantic. Other Sabres were at RCAF Station Grostenquin in eastern France, and Zweibrücken Air Base and CFB Baden–Soellingen in the west of West Germany. The aircraft took part in the Coronation fly past. 1 Wing moved to Marville, France in 1955.

In late 1955, No. 228 Operational Conversion Unit, temporarily renamed No. 238 OCU, was detached to North Luffenham from RAF Leeming which was having its runways extended to 7000 ft to accommodate Gloster Javelins. The OCU remained for over a year before returning to Leeming.

=== Thor missiles ===
From 1959 to 1963, North Luffenham was the base for PGM-17 Thor intermediate range ballistic missiles, operated by No. 144 Squadron RAF. The Thor missile site was listed as a Grade II* building in 2011.

In mid-1964 No. 3 Ground Radio Servicing Squadron was transferred from RAF Norton, Sheffield, Yorkshire. No. 3GRSS was responsible for the third-line maintenance repair of all ground radar and radio communication/navigational and landing aids located at airfields throughout Great Britain and Northern Ireland.

=== Aviation medicine ===
In 1963 the RAF Aviation Medical Training Centre (AMTC) moved from its original location at RAF Upwood to RAF North Luffenham. The Centre was commanded by a senior RAF Medical Officer who with his medical and technical team were responsible for fitting and instructing aircrew in the use of flying protective clothing and equipment, including partial pressure suits, which kept the pilot conscious in the event of loss of cabin pressure at high altitude. Instruction in medical aspects of high performance aviation included experience of hypoxia and exposure to sudden explosive decompression of an aircraft cabin. This was carried out in a complex of RAF Mark V decompression chambers installed on the site for aircrew training and research purposes. Many of the aircrew medical monitoring techniques, oxygen systems and items of aircrew protective flying clothing developed at the RAF Institute of Aviation Medicine, Farnborough, were assessed by staff of AMTC.

Princess Margaret visited on 12 July 1973.

=== Foreign language education ===
From 1965 to 1997 part of the Joint Services Language School was based here. Primary languages taught included Russian and Mandarin. Russian-language graduates of the school were employed at radio monitoring stations located close to the USSR border mostly in Gatow, Berlin, in order to monitor Russian air-to-ground radio voice traffic during airborne interception/ border incursion etc. Some also were stationed at Digby, and some were sent on airborne duties, variously stationed including Wyton, Cyprus etc. Most of the Chinese graduates were officers and stationed in Hong Kong. Most of the teachers were emigres or ex-Russian military. A plaque to commemorate the Language School was unveiled in 2005 by Air Commodore Bruce Benstead, the last Station Commander at RAF North Luffenham. Recruits from RAF Swinderby completed their fieldcraft training at this base in the 1980s and early 1990s.

=== Departure of the RAF ===
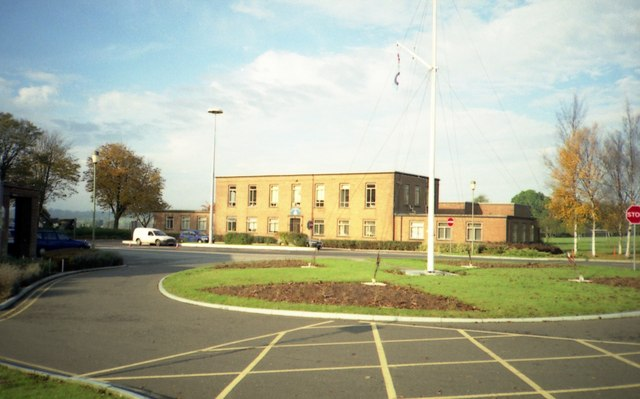
Station Headquarters in 1997

By April 1977 it was planned that most RAF units would be gone.

When the RAF vacated the base, the gates from the main entrance were donated to the village of North Luffenham. The gates which bear the station badge were later erected at the entrance to the village's recreation ground.

The station was taken over by the British Army and renamed St George's Barracks in 1998.

=== Former personnel ===
Notable former rugby players from RAF North Luffenham include Sir Augustus Walker (RAF & England), Peter Larter (Northampton & England) and Martin Whitcombe (Leicester Tigers & England 'B' international).

== List of Station Commanders ==
- April 1955, Group Captain A H Smythe
- late November 1956, Group Captain M W B Knight
- 2 January 1961, Group Captain John A Sowrey DFC (5 January 1920 – 30 November 2010) later Air Commodore, a wartime Hawker Hurricane pilot; his cousin was Air Marshal Freddie Sowrey
- mid August 1974, Group Captain R M S Fitzgerald-Lombard
- December 1974, Group Captain Graham V Lobley
- early January 1977, Group Captain John B Quinton, aged 42, with wife Olwyn, son Adrian, daughter Juliet; he attended a Birmingham grammar school, and studied Physics at the University of Nottingham in 1955
- 20 November 1978
- 21 July 1995, Group Captain G Jones
- 4 November 1996, Group Captain BG Benstead MBE

== Units ==
The following units were here at some point:

- No. 61 Squadron RAF between 17 July and September 1941 with the Avro Manchester
- No. 111 Squadron RAF between 19 February and 18 June 1958 with the Hawker Hunter F.6
- Detachment of No. 408 Squadron RCAF between December 1941 and September 1942

Units

- No. 12 (Pilots) Advanced Flying Unit RAF
- No. 17 Elementary Flying Training School RAF
- No. 21 Heavy Glider Conversion Unit RAF
- No. 29 Operational Training Unit RAF
- No. 73 Base RAF
- No. 102 Flying Refresher School RAF
- No. 151 (Air Defence Missile) Wing RAF
- No. 151 (SAM) Servicing Wing RAF
- No. 151 (Surface to Air Missile) Wing RAF
- No. 240 Operational Conversion Unit RAF
- No. 1382 (Transport) Conversion Unit RAF
- No. 1653 Heavy Conversion Unit RAF
- No. 2749 Squadron RAF Regiment
- No. 2797 Squadron RAF Regiment
- No. 2899 Squadron RAF Regiment
- No. 2952 Squadron RAF Regiment
- All Weather and Night Fighter Operational Conversion Unit
- Flying Training Command Instructors School
- Heavy Glider Conversion Unit RAF
- Midland Radar (1966-12 January 1990)

== See also ==
- List of former Royal Air Force stations
