= Operational conversion unit =

Air force unit

An operational conversion unit (OCU) is a unit within an air force whose role is to support preparation for the operational missions of a specific aircraft type by providing trained personnel. Operational conversion units teach pilots how to fly an aircraft and which tactics best exploit the performance of their aircraft and its weapons. The Royal Air Force and Royal Australian Air Force, among others, practise this method of training. The United States Navy calls its units in this role "fleet replacement squadrons".

An example of an OCU is No. 29 Squadron RAF, which was the second RAF squadron to receive the Eurofighter Typhoon.

The Royal Australian Air Force has a number of OCUs. These include No. 2 Operational Conversion Unit, No. 6 Squadron and No. 292 Squadron. These units are responsible for converting aircrews to the Lockheed Martin F-35 Lightning II, F/A-18F Super Hornet and Boeing P-8 Poseidon aircraft, respectively.

No. 42 Squadron RNZAF Is the only OCU in the Royal New Zealand Air Force. It flies the RNZAF's 4 Beechcraft Super King Air B200 in a Twin Engine conversion role. Until 2001 the RNZAF had No. 2 Squadron RNZAF. It flew the TA-4K Skyhawk in a Fighter Conversion Role but was mothballed along with the rest of the RNZAF's Air Combat Wing in 2001.

Royal Air Force OCUs have their origins in the post-war period. Before the Second World War, operational training was carried out in the squadron itself. With the coming of war, this method of training was no longer possible and some squadrons were reassigned to training duties. These were later renamed as "operational training units" (OTU) and in practice were larger than operational squadrons.

== See also ==
- List of conversion units of the Royal Air Force (OCU)
- List of Royal Air Force Operational Training Units (OTU)
