= No. 9 Squadron RAAF =

Royal Australian Air Force squadron

- Active: 1939–1944; 1962–1989; 2023–current
- Country: Australia
- Branch: Royal Australian Air Force
- Role: Maritime unmanned surveillance and reconnaissance aerial vehicle operations
- Garrison/HQ: RAAF Base Edinburgh (operations control)/RAAF Base Tindal (flight operations)
- Motto: Videmus Nec Videmur (Latin: "We See Without Being Seen")
- Engagements: World War II; Vietnam War

Commanders
- Notable commanders: Angus Houston (1987–1989)

Aircraft flown
- Helicopter: UH-1 Iroquois; S-70A Blackhawk
- Reconnaissance: Supermarine Seagull; Supermarine Walrus; MQ-4C Triton (2024–present)

No. 9 Squadron is a unit of the Royal Australian Air Force (RAAF). The squadron was formed in early 1939 and saw active service in World War II as a fleet co-operation unit providing aircrews for seaplanes operating off Royal Australian Navy cruisers. It was disbanded in late 1944, but was re-raised in 1962 and later became an Army co-operation unit, flying helicopters in support of Australian troops during the Vietnam War. The squadron was disbanded in 1989 when the RAAF transferred its battlefield helicopters to the Australian Army's aviation regiments. It was re-raised in June 2023 to operate Northrop Grumman MQ-4C Triton.

== History ==
=== Fleet co-operation ===
No. 9 Squadron was formed on 1 January 1939 at RAAF Base Richmond by renumbering No. 5 Squadron. On formation, the squadron's first commanding officer was a Royal Air Force officer, Squadron Leader J.A.S. Brown. As Australia's only fleet co-operation squadron No. 9 Squadron operated amphibious aircraft from the Royal Australian Navy's heavy and light cruisers; each cruiser was assigned a single Seagull or Walrus amphibian.

During the Second World War aircraft from No. 9 Squadron saw action with their parent ships in most of the world's oceans, ranging from the Arctic to the South Pacific on vessels such as HMA Ships Hobart, Sydney, Australia, Perth and Canberra. The amphibians were used to provide their parent ships with reconnaissance, anti-submarine protection, artillery spotting and general support. While the amphibians provided important support during the early years of the war, as the war progressed the Royal Australian Navy (RAN) enjoyed considerable support from land and carrier based aircraft and the amphibians were no longer necessary. In early January 1943, the squadron was transferred to Bowen, Queensland, from where its aircraft flew patrol operations. During 1944, all remaining RAN cruisers had their catapults removed and No. 9 Squadron was disbanded at RAAF Base Rathmines on 31 December 1944. Casualties during the war amounted to 22 killed, many of whom were lost when the ships they were serving on were sunk.

=== Army co-operation ===
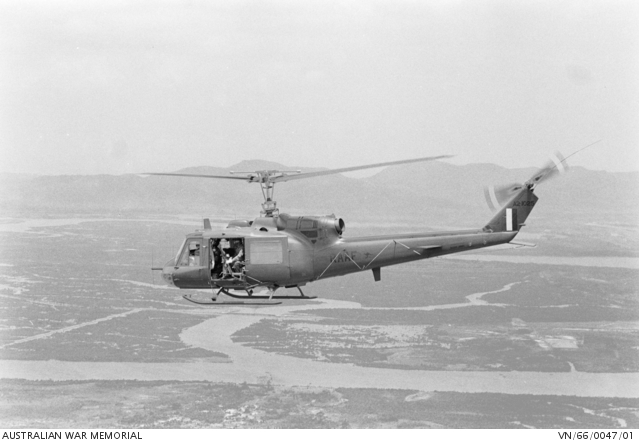
A No. 9 Squadron UH-1 in 1966

No. 9 Squadron was re-formed at RAAF Base Williamtown on 11 June 1962 equipped initially with Walruses before being re-equipped with UH-1 Iroquois helicopters and moving to RAAF Base Fairbairn. While originally formed to provide the RAAF with a search and rescue capability, the squadron's main role rapidly became providing airlift to the Australian Army.

The squadron deployed to Vung Tau Air Base, South Vietnam in mid-1966 as part of the 1st Australian Task Force (1 ATF) and began flying operations on 30 June 1966. The squadron provided the Task Force with part of its helicopter support, although most of it was provided by the US Army. Problems soon arose between No. 9 Squadron and Army commanders as the Air Board insisted "regulations, framed for peacetime, should apply". This limited the scope of No. 9 Squadron's operations, and according to Owen Eather, prevented the Iroquois helicopters from operating in "'insecure locations' or undertaking roles that were 'offensive'". Eather contends that this "exhibited a lack of awareness by the RAAF of the requirements of the ground force in South Vietnam", and it hampered Army operations to the extent that No. 9 Squadron was temporarily grounded. Alan Stephens, in the official history of the post-war RAAF, asserts however that the latter report is a myth and that squadron records indicate it operated constantly during the period of its supposed grounding between June and September 1966.

During the Battle of Long Tan on 18 August 1966 two No. 9 Squadron Iroquois flown by Flight Lieutenants Cliff Dohle and Frank Riley completed a hazardous mission to resupply D Company, 6 RAR which was heavily outnumbered and running dangerously low on ammunition. The mission proved vital in ensuring the survival of the Australian infantry until a relief force could fight its way through from Nui Dat and was completed despite heavy rain and the risk of ground fire. Following the withdrawal of the Viet Cong a number of helicopters were used to evacuate the Australian casualties from the battlefield. RAAF-Army relations improved considerably following Long Tan. No. 9 Squadron subsequently developed new operational concepts and procedures, achieving consistently high rates of aircraft availability, mission success and a low loss rate. A close professional relationship was also developed with the Special Air Service which saw the squadron provide rapid and precise insertion and extraction of patrols into jungle landing zones at tree top height.

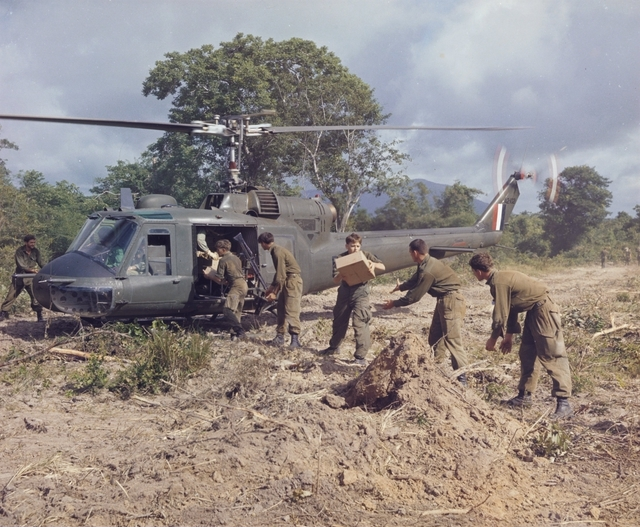
Soldiers from the 7th Battalion, Royal Australian Regiment unloading supplies from a No. 9 Squadron helicopter in 1967

While deployed to Vietnam, in 1967 the squadron was re-equipped with updated versions of the Iroquois, and was also reinforced with personnel from the RAN and the Royal New Zealand Air Force’s No. 3 Squadron RNZAF. Operations in South Vietnam proved hazardous, with aircrews regularly exposed to ground fire, poor flying conditions, nighttime medevacs and dangerously small jungle landing zones that were sometimes booby trapped with land mines. The unit lost seven Iroquois and two crewmen in action during its deployment. As part of the general Australian withdrawal, No. 9 Squadron departed South Vietnam on 8 December 1971. Upon its return to Australia, No. 9 Squadron was based at RAAF Base Amberley, where it continued to provide airlift to the Australian Army and search and rescue for the civilian community. Between 1982 and 1986, the squadron contributed eight aircraft and aircrew to the Australian helicopter detachment which formed part of the Multinational Force and Observers in the Sinai Peninsula of Egypt.

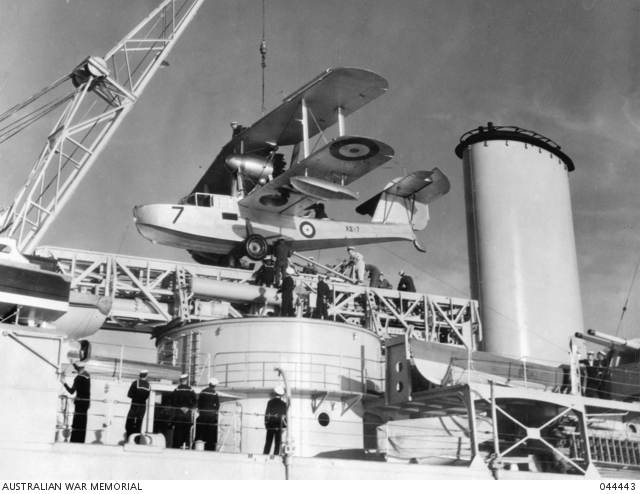
A No. 9 Squadron Walrus aircraft embarked on an Australian light cruiser in 1939

In 1986, the Australian Government decided to transfer all of the RAAF's battlefield helicopter capability to the Australian Army after a decision that all battlefield helicopters should be controlled directly by the Army – a decision partly based on the Vietnam experience and problems that arose during the first few months of the deployment by having No. 9 Squadron based in Vung Tau under separate command, rather than co-located with 1 ATF at Nui Dat, approximately 50 kilometres (31 mi) north. This had caused a number of problems with support for the task force with the Army initially regarding No. 9 Squadron as being unreliable and unwilling to expose themselves to enemy fire, unlike US Army units.

During February 1988, No. 9 Squadron was re-equipped with S-70A Blackhawk helicopters. Upon converting to the new aircraft the squadron moved to Townsville where it was disbanded on 14 February 1989. The squadron's aircrew and aircraft were then used to form 'A' Squadron of the Australian Army's 5th Aviation Regiment. The squadron's last commanding officer was Wing Commander (later Air Chief Marshal) Angus Houston.

== Maritime surveillance ==
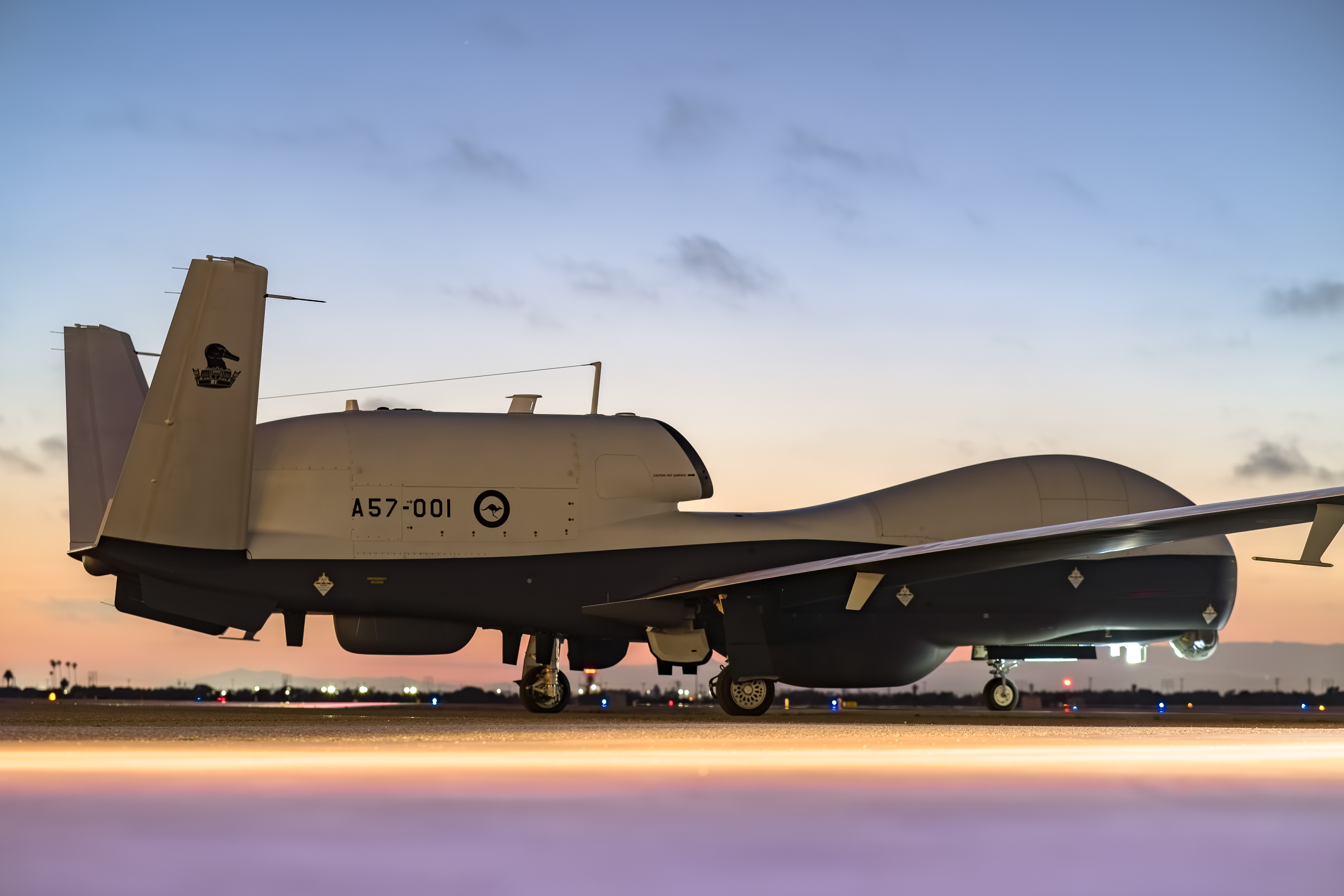
The RAAF's first MQ-4C Triton in June 2024

At the 2023 Avalon airshow, Northrop Grumman displayed a full-scale mock-up of an RAAF MQ-4C Triton wearing No. 9 Squadron markings. Australian Defence Magazine reported that No. 9 Squadron would join No. 10 and No. 11 Squadron as a dedicated maritime Intelligence Surveillance and Reconnaissance (ISR) unit. On 3 March, the Defence Minister and Chief of Air Force announced that the squadron would be reactivated in June 2023 to operate the Tritons due to enter service in 2024.

The squadron was re-raised on 11 June 2023 as part of No. 92 Wing. It is headquartered at RAAF Base Edinburgh in South Australia, and the Tritons will mainly operate from RAAF Base Tindal in the Northern Territory.

The first RAAF Triton arrived in Australia on 16 June 2024. Four aircraft have been ordered with three delivered.

== Aircraft operated ==
No. 9 Squadron operated the following aircraft types:

- Supermarine Seagull (1939–1944)
- Supermarine Walrus (1939–1944 & 1962)
- UH-1 Iroquois (1962–1988)
- S-70A Blackhawk (1988–1989)
- MQ-4C Triton (2024–present)
