= Lockheed AP-3C Orion =

Australian patrol and anti-submarine aircraft

AP-3C Orion
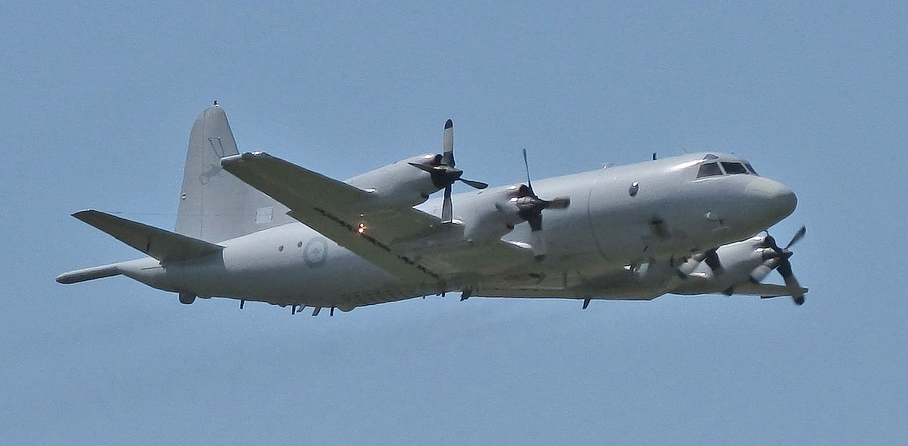
- AP-3C Orion

General information
- Type: Maritime patrol aircraft
- National origin: United States
- Manufacturer: Lockheed Corporation
- Status: Retired
- Primary user: Royal Australian Air Force
- Number built: 18

History
- Introduction date: 2002
- First flight: 19 May 1999
- Last flight: 5 December 2023
- Developed from: Lockheed P-3 Orion

The Lockheed AP-3C Orion is a variant of the P-3 Orion formerly used by the Royal Australian Air Force (RAAF) for tasks such as naval fleet support, maritime surveillance, search and survivor supply and anti-surface and anti-submarine warfare. The 18 AP-3C Orions were upgraded from P-3Cs between 1997 and 2005, with the program taking three years longer than expected due to systems integration problems. All 18 AP-3C Orions were operated by No. 92 Wing which is based at RAAF Base Edinburgh in South Australia. Aircraft from the wing have seen service as part of Australian Defence Force operations in Australia, South East Asia and the Middle East. They were retired in 2019 following the introduction of the Boeing P-8 Poseidon to the RAAF fleet. The two AP-3C(EW) variants equipped for electronic and signals intelligence (ELINT/SIGINT) were retired in December 2023.

== Development ==
The AP-3C Orion project began in the early 1990s to upgrade the radar and mission systems on 18 of Australia's 19 P-3C-II Orions. L3 Communications completed the prototype AP-3C at its facility at Greenville, Texas. The other 17 aircraft were upgraded at Avalon Airport in Australia under a sub-contract to Australian companies. Tenix Defence took over the project in mid-2003 and BAE Systems was involved with many of the aircraft's sub-systems and developing a simulation facility. Work began on the first AP-3C in January 1997 and the original project schedule called for this aircraft to be provided to the RAAF for operational acceptance trials in March 1998 and all upgrades to be completed by the end of 2001. The remaining 19th Orion was not included in the upgrade program, and the Australian military stated in 2005 that it is "used for development purposes".

When the Australian Orion upgrade project was being developed in 1996 there was not an 'off the shelf' package of upgrades that met the requirements specified by the RAAF. As a result, it was decided to tailor the upgrade to Australian specifications, which included integrating different systems. The systems integration task proved to be much more difficult than was expected, and L3 Communications and its suppliers were required to write over two million lines of software code.

As a result of the systems integration problems delivery of upgraded Orions was delayed by three years. The first two aircraft were handed over to the RAAF in December 2001 and the final AP-3C was delivered in early 2005. This delay caused a major reduction in the RAAF's maritime surveillance capability, and in February 2001 only nine of the RAAF's 17 Orions were operational.

== Capabilities ==
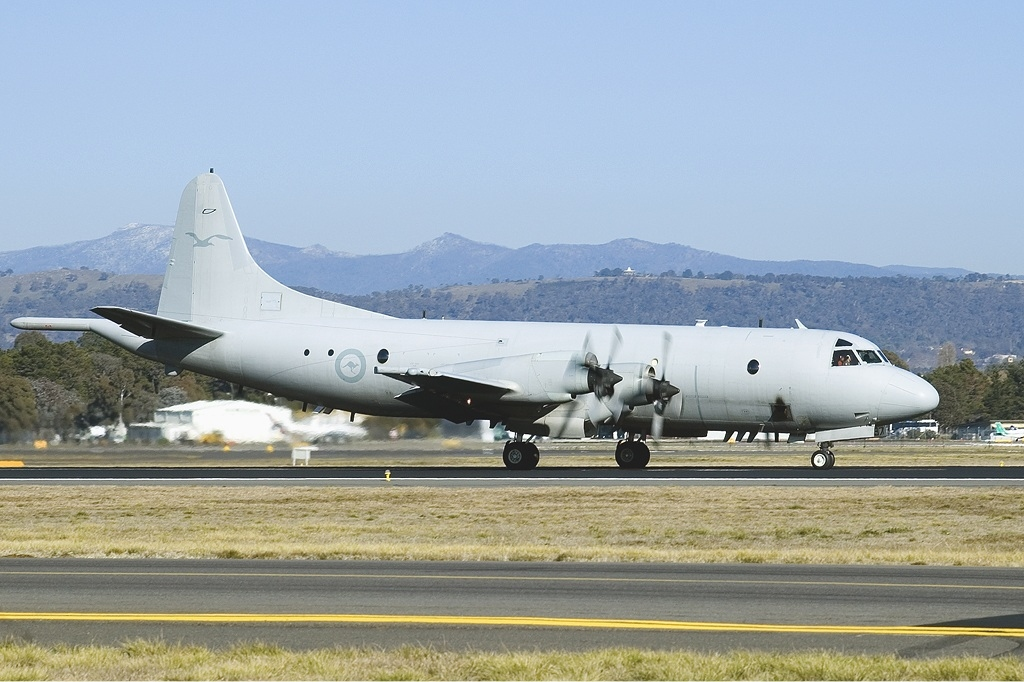
An AP-3C at Canberra Airport in 2005

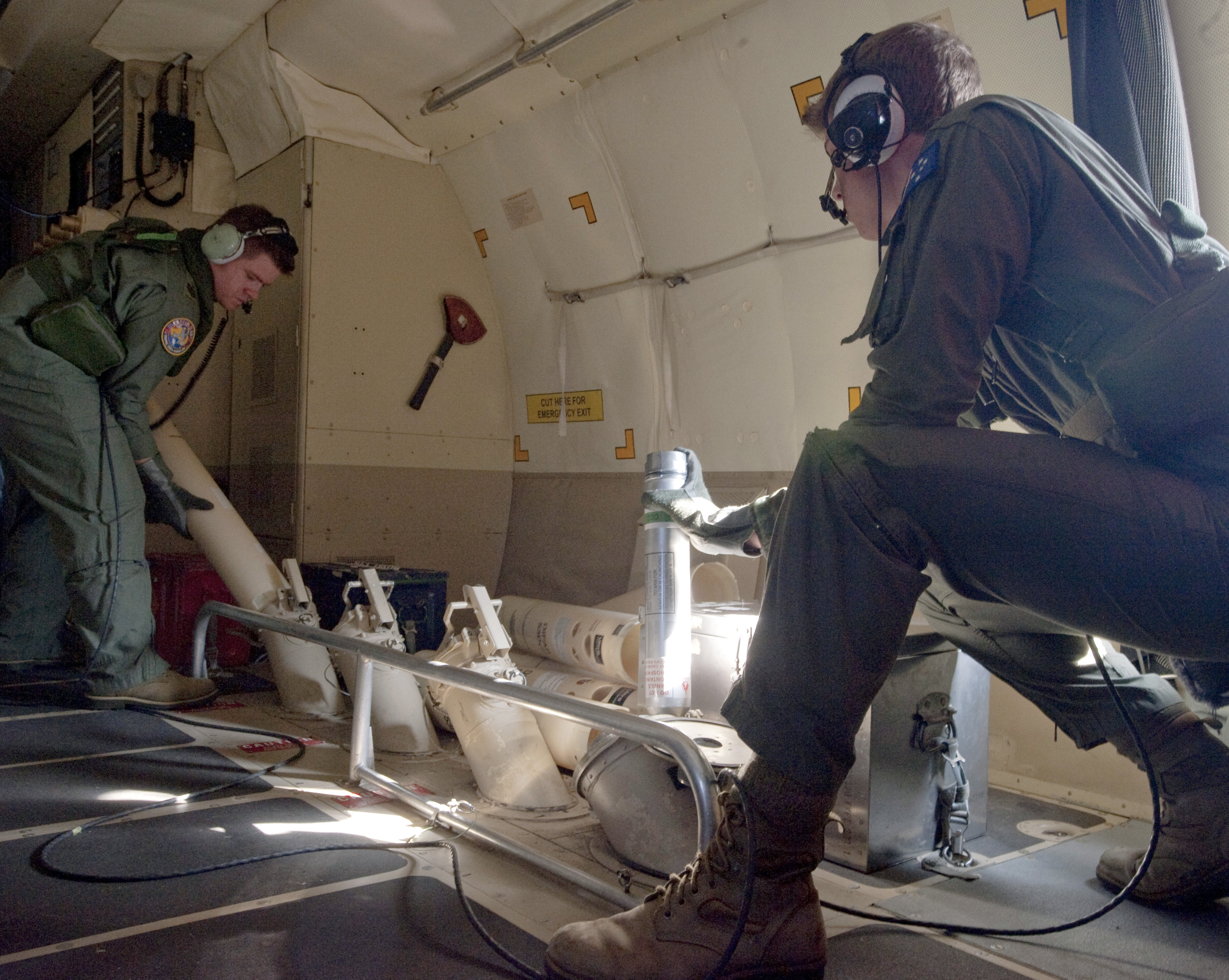
Two crewmen loading sonobuoys on board an AP-3C

The AP-3C upgrade improved the Orions' radar, intelligence-gathering and computing systems. The upgrade included fitting each aircraft with a new Elta EL/M-2022(V)3 radar, a nose-mounted Star Safire III electro-optical and infrared system, "highly capable" signals and electronic intelligence (SIGINT/ELINT) equipment, the UYS 503 acoustic system, a new automatic information system processor, a new navigation system based on two Honeywell H764G Embedded GPS/INUs, a new communications system and other improvements. The Orions' weight was also reduced by more than 3,000 kilograms (6,600 lb) as part of the upgrade.

The AP-3Cs' new radar and electronic surveillance system greatly increased the capabilities of the RAAF's Orion fleet. These new systems allow the Orions to detect and identify more targets and at longer range. In 2002 the then-Chief of Air Force Air Vice Marshal Angus Houston claimed that the AP-3Cs were the best maritime patrol aircraft in the world and The Australian reported that they were superior to the United States Navy's Orions, though an upgrade was planned for the USN's Orion fleet.

There has been speculation that one or more of the AP-3Cs was fitted with additional SIGINT/ELINT capabilities and operate as specialised intelligence-gathering aircraft. An article in the magazine Australian Aviation in December 2007 stated that this is probably not correct, and it is more likely that several SIGINT/ELINT 'kits' were purchased and can be swapped between all 18 airframes. The magazine also quoted an unnamed 'industry source' as stating that all the AP-3Cs have SIGINT/ELINT capabilities "equivalent or better" than those of the Royal Air Force's specialised Hawker Siddeley Nimrod surveillance aircraft. Jane's World Air Forces states that the RAAF's 19th Orion was converted to an EP-3 signals reconnaissance aircraft in 1997, however, and was operational as late as 2009.

The aircraft are equipped with AGM-84 Harpoon anti-ship missiles, Mark 46 or MU90 Impact torpedoes, mines, and a range of sonar buoys and other stores.

AP-3C Orions have a normal crew complement of 13, broken down as follows:

- two pilots (captain and co-pilot)
- two flight engineers
- tactical co-ordinator
- navigator/communication officer
- sensor employment manager
- six airborne electronic analysts.

In addition to their traditional maritime surveillance role, AP-3Cs have been equipped for over-land surveillance roles. As of 2007, the RAAF's two-aircraft Orion detachment in the Middle East was spending 60 percent of its flying time conducting intelligence gathering, surveillance and reconnaissance over Iraq.

On 14 May 2007 BAE Systems Australia was awarded an $76.1 million contract to provide an upgraded electronic support measures (ESM) system for the Orions. The contract involved replacing existing sub-systems and ground support systems from 2011.

In 2008 the Australian Government awarded contracts for further enhancements to the AP-3C fleet. Under this project 18 Orions were to be equipped with new electro-optical/infrared sensors, tactical common datalinks and video recorders by 2011.

== Operational history ==
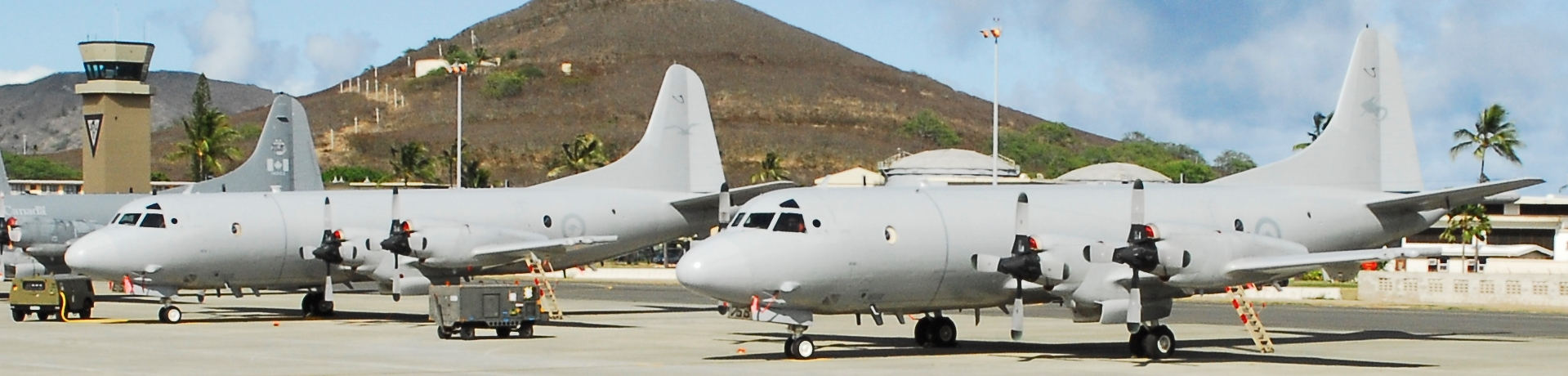
Two AP-3C Orions in July 2010

All AP-3Cs were assigned to No. 92 Wing RAAF, which forms part of the air force's Surveillance and Response Group. Each of the 18 aircraft is permanently allocated to either No. 10 Squadron or No. 11 Squadron rather than being placed in a wing-owned pool. AP-3C aircraft are also used by the RAAF's Orion operational conversion unit, No. 292 Squadron, for training flights.

The AP-3Cs have seen extensive operational service. The first operational deployment of one of the upgraded aircraft was conducted in late 2002, when an AP-3C assigned to No. 10 Squadron flew border protection patrols from Darwin. The Orions have subsequently formed an important part of Operation Resolute, the Australian Defence Force's contribution to patrolling Australia's Exclusive Economic Zone. As part of this operation Orions fly regular missions around Australia's western and northern approaches and report the results of their patrols to Maritime Border Command. AP-3Cs also periodically conduct patrols over the Indian Ocean, Strait of Malacca and South China Sea from RMAF Butterworth in Malaysia as part of Operation Gateway. A single AP-3C was also deployed to Pago Pago in American Samoa during November and December 2006 to support the Australian force deployed off Fiji in response to the 2006 Fijian coup d'état.

Further afield, a detachment of two AP-3Cs was based in the Middle East from 2003 until late 2012 as part of Australia's commitment to the war on terrorism (Operation Slipper) and the Iraq War (Operation Catalyst). These aircraft conducted maritime surveillance patrols over the Persian Gulf and North Arabian Sea; providing support to Coalition warships and boarding parties; and conducting extensive overland flights of Iraq to support the Coalition ground forces there. By December 2007 the AP-3C detachment had conducted 1,200 sorties totaling more than 11,000 hours of flying. The aircraft also operated over Afghanistan conducting intelligence, surveillance and reconnaissance missions, as well supporting counter-piracy operations in Somalia. This deployment ended in December 2012; by this time the aircraft had flown over 2,400 sorties; and more than 3,500 No. 92 Wing personnel had served in the Middle East.

In February 2009 an AP-3C Orion conducted flights over the state of Victoria in which it used its sophisticated cameras to map the damage and destruction caused by the Black Saturday bushfires and to search for survivors.

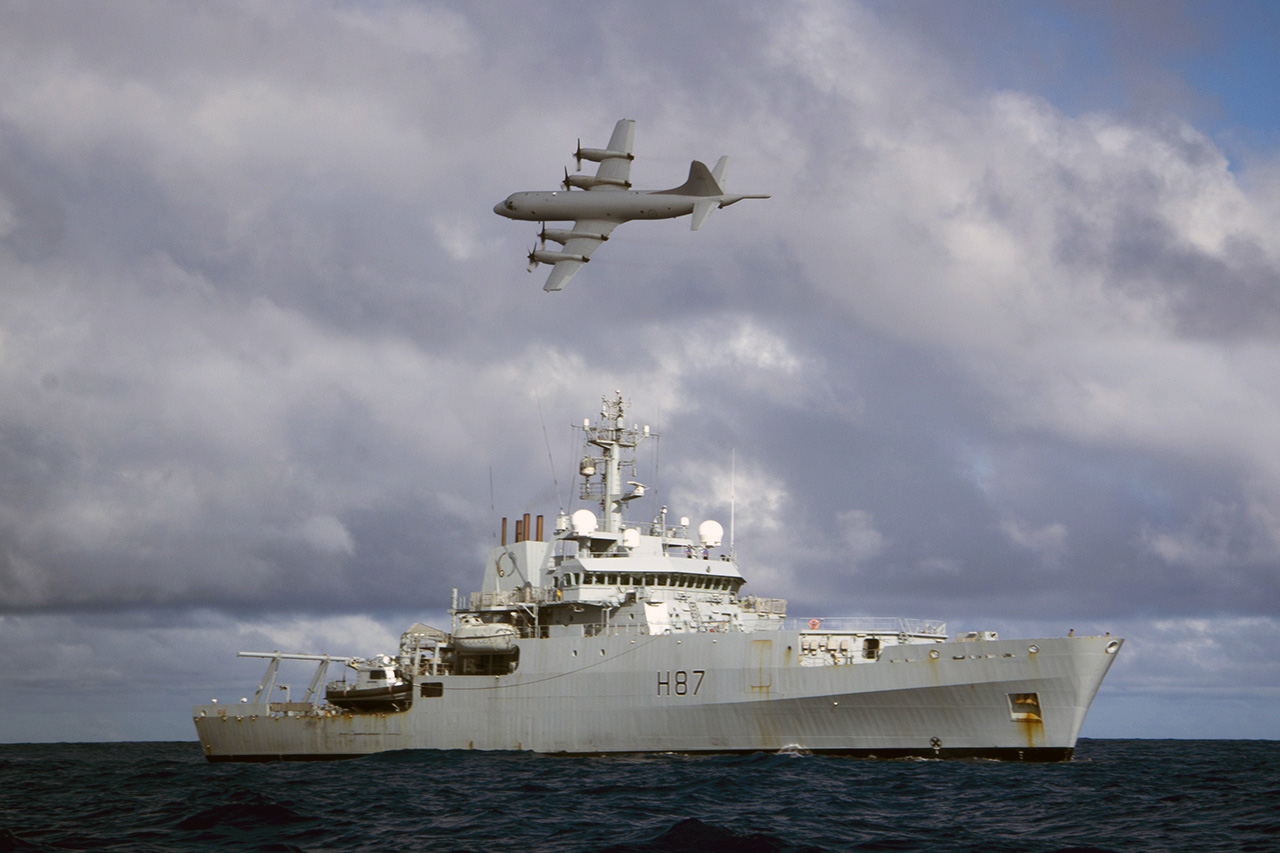
AP-3C flies over British survey ship HMS Echo during MH370 search

In March 2014, four AP-3Cs participated in the search for Malaysia Airlines Flight 370.

In December 2015, it was reported by the BBC that an AP-3C Orion aircraft from the Royal Australian Air Force conducted freedom of navigation exercises over contested islands in the South China Sea. The Department of Defence released a statement stating that the Orion had conducted routine maritime patrols between 25 November and 4 December as part of a regular surveillance operation. The aircraft was operating as a part of Operation Gateway, Australia's "enduring contribution to the preservation of regional security and stability in South East Asia".

In June 2017 the Australian Government announced that two AP-3C Orions would operate over Mindanao in the Philippines to gather intelligence for Filipino forces engaged in the Marawi crisis.

== Replacement ==
The AP-3Cs were replaced by the Boeing P-8A Poseidon and the MQ-4C Triton. The RAAF operates 13 P-8A multi-mission maritime patrol aircraft. The RAAF is acquiring four MQ-4C Tritons remotely piloted aircraft systems to be based at RAAF Base Tindal. The first MQ-4C was delivered in July 2024 and last is scheduled to be delivered in 2028. The RAAF is acquiring four modified Gulfstream G550 Intelligence, Surveillance, Reconnaissance and Electronic Warfare (ISREW) aircraft designated the MC-55A Peregrine. The first MC-55A Peregrine arrived in Australia in January 2026. The remaining three MC-55A Peregrines are scheduled to be delivered in 2026.

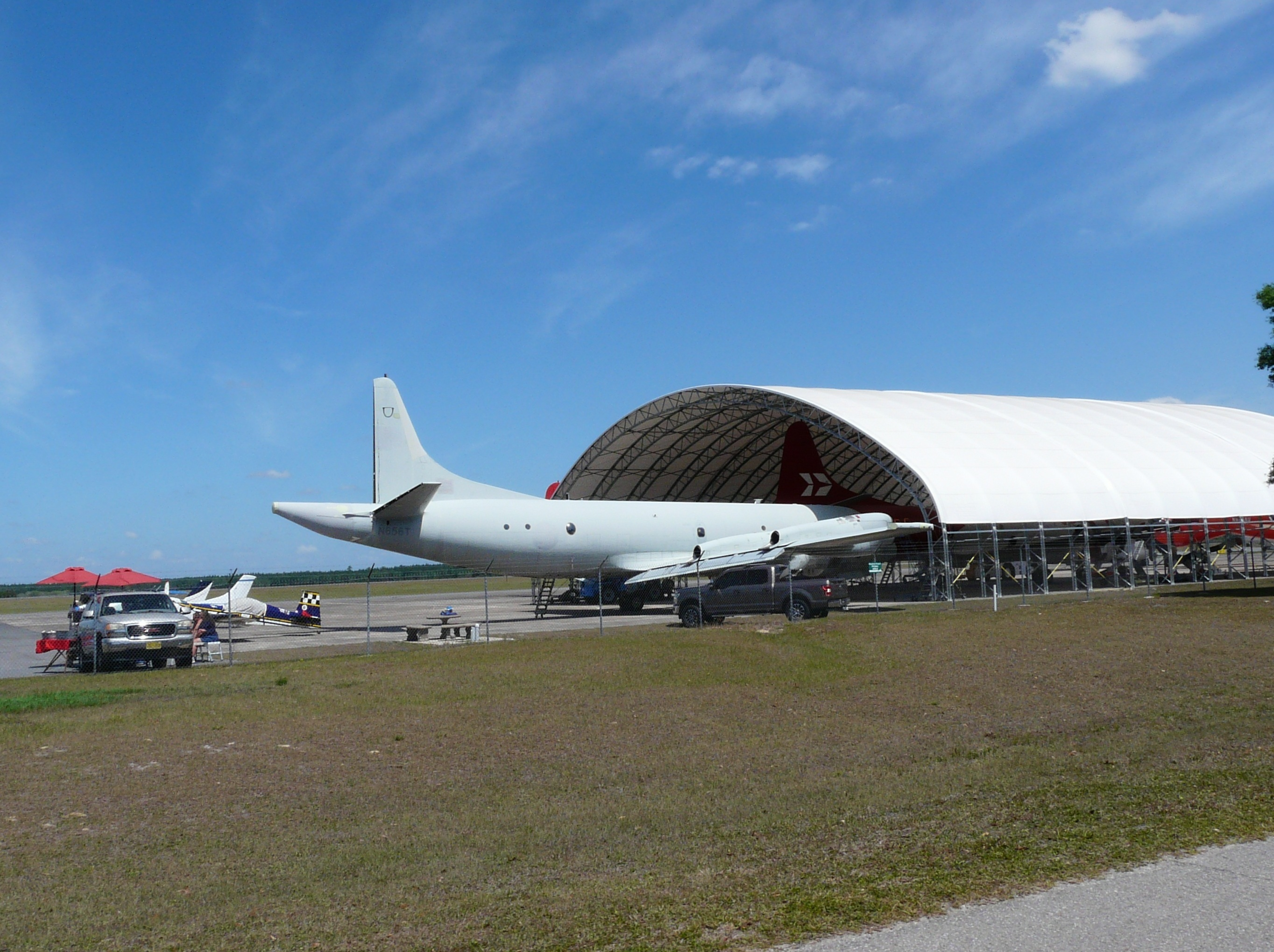
N656T, formerly A9-656, at Keystone Heights Airport

Five AP-3C were acquired by MHD-Rockland Services in the United States for use as water bombers.

== Operators ==
Australia

- Royal Australian Air Force
  - No. 10 Squadron
  - No. 11 Squadron (until 25 November 2016 when they formally transitioned to the P-8A Poseidon)
  - No. 292 Squadron

== Survivors ==
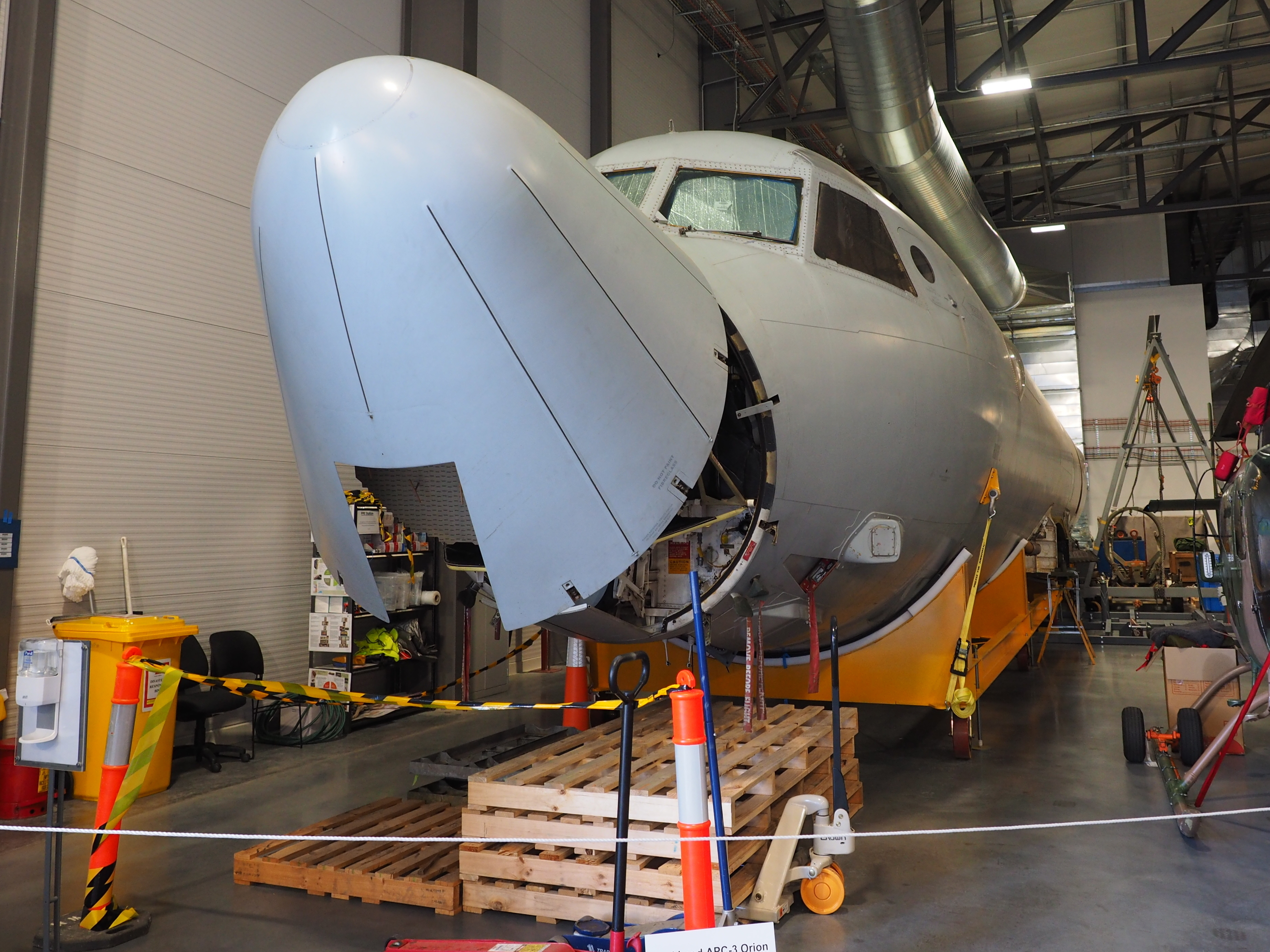
AP-3C Orion A9-659 in storage at the Australian War Memorial's Treloar Technology Centre in 2023

- A9-659 - Held by the Australian War Memorial since 2019.
- A9-751 - RAAF Museum
- A9-753 - Historical Aircraft Restoration Society (HARS), Shellharbour Airport, New South Wales, Australia. Ex-Royal Australian Air Force A9-753 10 Squadron, and 292 Squadron as a static training aid. Officially handed over to HARS by the RAAF on 3 November 2017. It will be maintained as a flying warbird.
- A9-760 - Held by Queensland Air Museum having been officially transferred to them on 11 June 2018.

== Specifications (AP-3C Orion) ==
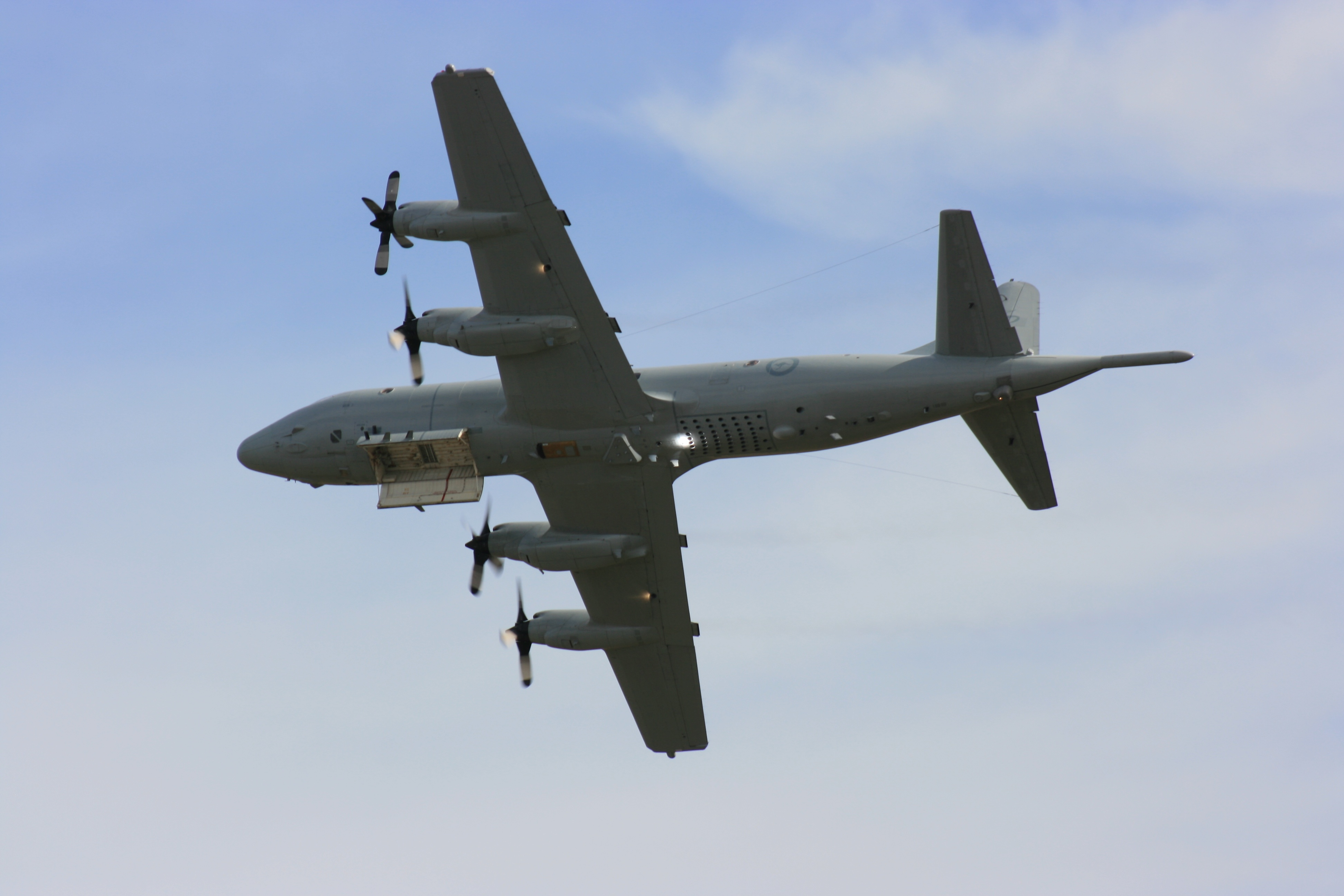
An AP-3C Orion with its bomb bay doors open

Data from

General characteristics

- Crew: 13
- Length: 116 ft 10 in (35.61 m)
- Wingspan: 101 ft 6 in (30.94 m)
- Height: 34 ft 3 in (10.44 m)
- Wing area: 1,300 sq ft (120 m^{2})
- Airfoil: root: NACA 0014-1.10; tip: NACA 0012-1.10
- Empty weight: 61,509 lb (27,900 kg)
- Max takeoff weight: 134,923 lb (61,200 kg)
- Powerplant: 4 × Allison T56-A-14 turboshaft engines, 4,600 shp (3,400 kW) each
- Propellers: 4-bladed constant-speed fully-feathering propellers

Performance

- Maximum speed: 405 kn (466 mph, 750 km/h)
- Combat range: 2,346 nmi (2,700 mi, 4,345 km)
- Ferry range: 4,866 nmi (5,600 mi, 9,012 km)
- Service ceiling: 28,300 ft (8,600 m)
- Rate of climb: 3,140 ft/min (16.0 m/s)
- Wing loading: 107 lb/sq ft (520 kg/m^{2})
- Power/mass: 0.03 hp/lb (0.049 kW/kg)
