= Marija Jovanovich =

Australian air force test pilot

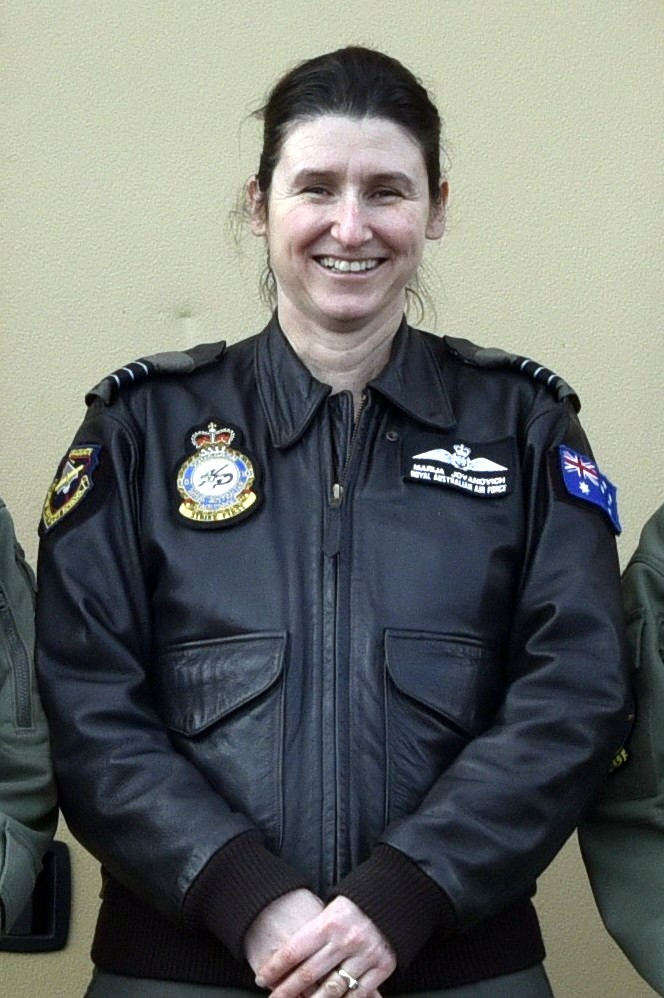
- Wing Commander Marija Jovanovich in November 2022
- Born: 1982 (age 43–44); Kruševac, Yugoslavia
- Military career
- Allegiance: Australia
- Branch: Royal Australian Air Force
- Service years: 2001–present
- Rank: Group Captain
- Nickname: "Maz"
- Commands: No. 10 Squadron RAAF (2020–23)
- Conflicts: Iraq War; War in Afghanistan
- Awards: Member of the Order of Australia; Conspicuous Service Medal

Marija Jovanovich, AM, CSM (born 1982) is an Australian military test pilot and the most senior female pilot in the Royal Australian Air Force (RAAF). Jovanovich has over 3,300 hours of flight experience, in over 30 different types of aircraft. She commanded No. 10 Squadron RAAF from December 2020 to December 2023. Jovanovich is the second female pilot in RAAF’s history to take command of a flying unit.

== Early life ==
Born in Kruševac, Yugoslavia, in 1982, Jovanovich is the eldest of three daughters of surgeons Snežana and Aleksandar Jovanovich. The family left Yugoslavia in 1995 to escape from the Yugoslav Wars, and settled in New Zealand. Jovanovich arrived not knowing any English. She attended high school in Auckland and first began learning to fly in a Cessna 152 at the Walsh Memorial Flying School in Matamata. In 1999, beginning with her father Aleksandar, the family began moving to Australia; Jovanovich followed later in the year, after graduating from high school.

== Military career ==
Jovanovich joined the Royal Australian Air Force (RAAF) in 2001 and studied at the Australian Defence Force Academy (ADFA) from 2001 to 2004. In 2004 she graduated with a Bachelor of Science majoring in mathematics and physics, with first class Honours and a University Medal in physics. Jovanovich undertook flying training on the CT-4B and PC-9/A aircraft and graduated from No. 206 Pilots Course in 2006. After graduating from ADFA and pilot training, she flew the P3 Orion on operations and exercises all over the world, including the Middle East, US, Asia, and Southwest Pacific. She earned her Masters in Systems Engineering in 2013. In 2013, Jovanovich attended the prestigious United States Air Force Test Pilot School, flying 23 types of aircraft over the duration of the course. She was the first Australian in 25 years to complete the course.

On return from the US, Jovanovich worked as a test pilot at the Aircraft Research and Development Unit RAAF at RAAF Base Edinburgh. In December 2020 Jovanovich assumed command of No. 10 Squadron RAAF, becoming the third woman to lead a RAAF flying squadron. No. 10 Squadron became the first RAAF squadron to simultaneously have a female commanding officer and a female executive officer in 2021, when Squadron Leader Jenna Higgins was appointed executive officer. Jovanovich described this as "Both a big deal and not a big deal. It’s a big deal because we’re breaking new ground, and it’s not a big deal because at 10 Sqn that’s honestly just business as usual. Everybody just accepts that we’re here because we’re awesome at our jobs, and we are. So, we just get on with it".

Jovanovich was promoted to the rank of group captain in 2023, becoming the first female pilot in the RAAF to achieve this rank. She was appointed a Member of the Order of Australia in the 2025 Australia Day Honours.

== Awards ==
- 2019 – Conspicuous Service Medal (CSM) for meritorious achievement and devotion to duty as the initial Commander of Task Element 629.3.1.1 during operation PHILIPPINES ASSIST, supporting the liberation of Marawi.
- 2025 – Member of the Order of Australia in the Australia Day Honours.
