= No. 92 Wing RAAF =

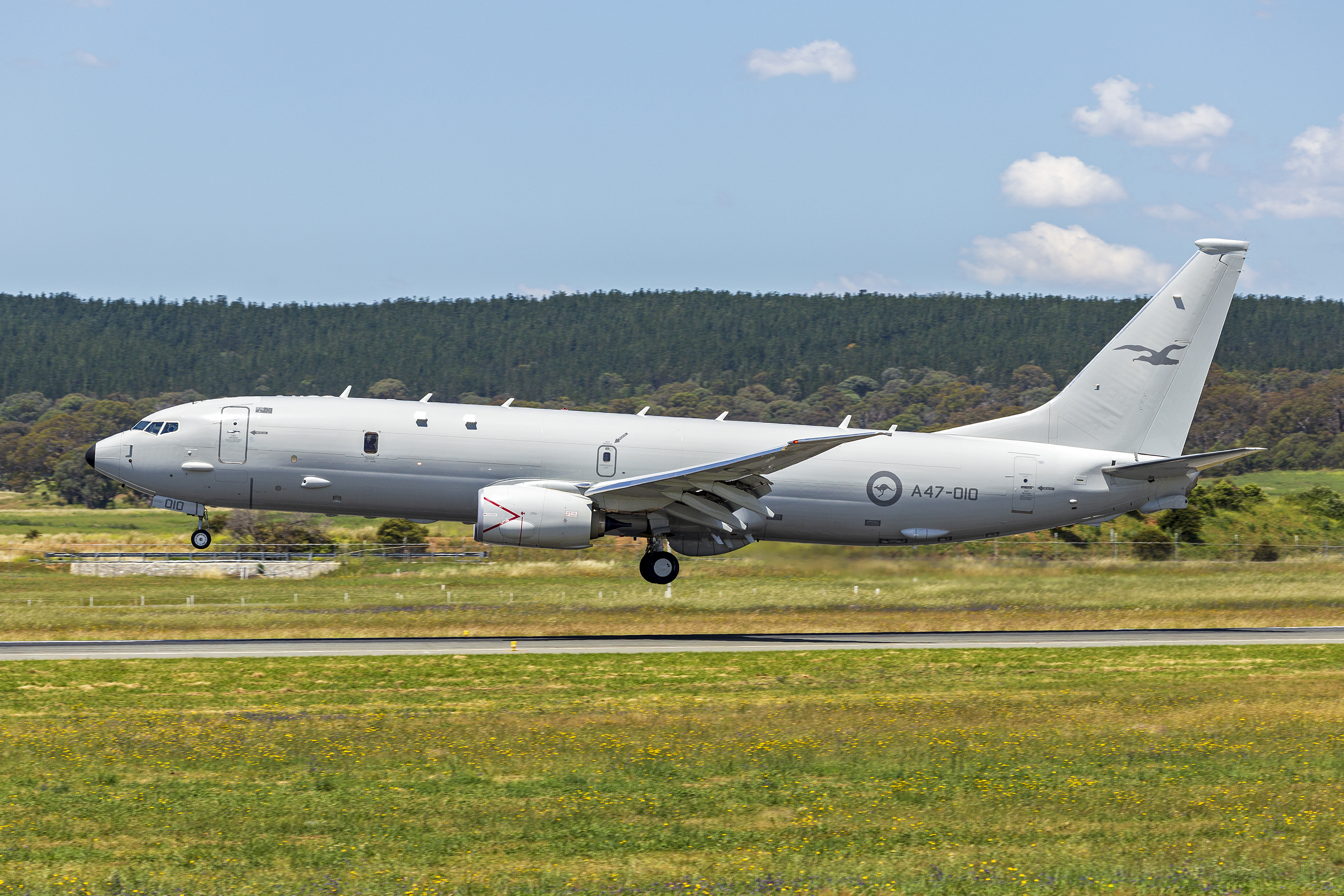
- A P-8A Poseidon in November 2020
- Active: 1 July 1977 – present
- Branch: Royal Australian Air Force
- Role: Intelligence, surveillance and reconnaissance, Electronic Warfare, anti-submarine and anti-surface warfare, search and survivor supply
- Part of: Surveillance & Response Group
- Garrison/HQ: RAAF Base Edinburgh
- Mottos: Watch and Ward
- Aircraft: P-8A Poseidon; MQ-4C Triton; MC-55A Peregrine

Commanders
- Current commander: GPCAPT Jim Collisson

No. 92 Wing is the intelligence, surveillance and reconnaissance wing of the Royal Australian Air Force, to include conducting maritime patrol, anti surface and submarine warfare, and electronic warfare. Headquartered at RAAF Base Edinburgh, 92WG is part of the Surveillance and Response Group. 92 Wing currently comprises five squadrons – No. 9 Squadron (operating the MQ-4C Triton), No. 10 Squadron (operating the MC-55A Peregrine), No. 11 Squadron (operating the P-8A Poseidon), No. 12 Squadron (operating the P-8A), and No. 292 Squadron (the P-8A operational training squadron). The wing also has a detachment headquarters at RMAF Base Butterworth in Malaysia. 92WG operates 14 P-8A Poseidon maritime patrol aircraft, 4 MQ-4C Triton unmanned aerial system (UAS), and 4 MC-55A airborne intelligence, surveillance, reconnaissance and electronic warfare aircraft. The P-8A is multi-role platform, capable of F2T2EA. Its roles include anti-submarine and anti-surface surveillance and warfare, for which the aircraft are equipped with MK54 torpedoes and Harpoon anti shipping missiles. It is also responsible for long range intelligence, surveillance, reconnaissance and maritime attack missions, Naval support and search and survivor supply missions. The Australian Maritime search area of responsibility constitutes approximately 11% of the Earth's surface, the largest area of responsibility for any single country.

On 1 July 1977, No. 92 Wing was formed based at RAAF Base Edinburgh and consisted of No. 10 Squadron, No. 11 Squadron, a maintenance squadron, and a maritime analysis and training squadron.

== Recent history ==
The return to Australia of the No 92 Wing Detachment in the Middle East Area of Operations (MEAO) in November 2012 marked the end of the longest deployment of an Air Force element on combat operations to date. While based in the Middle East, the aircraft and crews flew missions for three separate operations (Operation Slipper, Operation Catalyst and Operation Falconer). During this highly successful 10-year deployment, both the character of missions and the tactics employed to achieve success changed markedly. The AP-3C Orion detachments conducted more than 2400 missions, comprising more than 22,300 hours of flying over Iraq, Afghanistan, Persian Gulf, Arabian Sea and off the Somali coast.

In late-June 2017, two No. 10 Squadron AP-3C Orion aircraft were deployed to the southern Philippines to assist during the Marawi crisis.

No. 11 Squadron has taken delivery of 12 P-8A Poseidon, the first of which arrived at RAAF Base Edinburgh in November 2016, and the last arriving December 2019. No. 292 Squadron has been equipped with new P-8A Poseidon operational flight and mission simulators. These P-8A Poseidon aircraft have replaced the AP-3C Orion which first entered military service in 1962 and became the 'work horse' of No. 10 Squadron and No. 11 Squadron which both have histories dating back to World War II.

In April 2018, a No. 11 Squadron P-8A Poseidon was deployed to Japan to conduct maritime surveillance to prevent sanctions evasions by North Korea. No. 92 Wing aircraft have subsequently been periodically deployed to the region as part of Operation Argos.

In May 2019, No. 10 Squadron was transferred to No. 42 Wing, where it continued to operate two AP-3C(EW) Orions in an electronic warfare role.

In October 2019, a No. 11 Squadron P-8A Poseidon was deployed to the Middle East in support of a US-led International Maritime Security Construct, which includes forces from the US, Saudi Arabia, Bahrain and the UK.

In January 2020, during the devastating and unprecedented Australia wide bush fires, a No. 11 Squadron P-8A Poseidon was utilised under the Emergency Defence Assistance to the Civil Community role as a surveillance asset for Operation Bushfire Assist.

In June 2023, No. 9 Squadron was re-raised as an element of No. 92 Wing to operate the MQ-4C Triton. The squadron headquarters will be based at RAAF Base Edinburgh in South Australia with the Triton mainly operated from RAAF Base Tindal in the Northern Territory. The first of four Tritons the squadron will operate arrived in Australia in June 2024.

On 4 September 2023, No. 42 Wing was disbanded and No. 10 Squadron was transferred back to No. 92 Wing.

In October 2025, No. 12 Squadron was re-raised to operate Poseidons alongside No. 11 Squadron. It is based at RAAF Base Edinburgh.

In January 2026, No. 10 Squadron received the first of four MC-55A Peregrines ordered for the RAAF.
