= No. 10 Squadron RAAF =

Royal Australian Air Force squadron

- No. 10 Squadron's crest
- Active: 1939–1945; 1949–current
- Country: Australia
- Branch: Royal Australian Air Force
- Role: Intelligence, Surveillance and Reconnaissance Electronic Warfare
- Part of: No. 92 Wing
- Base: RAAF Base Edinburgh
- Motto: "Strike First"
- Engagements: World War II; East Timor; Iraq; Afghanistan
- Battle honours: Atlantic 1939–1945, Biscay 1940–1945, Mediterranean 1940–1943, Biscay Ports 1940–1945, English Channel and North Sea 1939–1945, Bismarck, Normandy 1944

Commanders
- Notable commanders: William Brill (1949–1950); Marija Jovanovich (2020–2023)

Aircraft flown
- Reconnaissance: MC-55A Peregrine

No. 10 Squadron is a Royal Australian Air Force (RAAF) signals intelligence (SIGINT) squadron based at RAAF Base Edinburgh, South Australia. It is part of No. 92 Wing RAAF. The squadron was formed in 1939 as a maritime patrol unit. It saw active service during the Second World War, conducting anti-submarine operations and patrols from bases in the United Kingdom until it disbanded in late 1945. It was re-formed in Australia in 1949 and since then has contributed to Australia's East Timor intervention, and has been deployed to the Middle East as part of the war on terrorism and the 2003 Gulf War. Most recently it now has a signals intelligence mission.

== History ==
=== Second World War ===
No. 10 Squadron was formed on 1 July 1939 at RAAF Base Point Cook, under the command of Wing Commander Leon Lachal. Later that month aircrew and ground staff from the squadron departed for Britain to be trained on the Short Sunderland aircraft which had been acquired to equip the squadron. While it was intended that the aircrew would fly these aircraft to Australia after completing their training, following the outbreak of war the Australian government offered to retain the squadron in Britain. As a result, No. 10 Squadron was both the first RAAF squadron and the first British Commonwealth squadron to see active service in the Second World War, when one of its aircraft made a flight to Tunisia on 10 October 1939. It was also the only RAAF squadron to see continuous active service throughout the war.

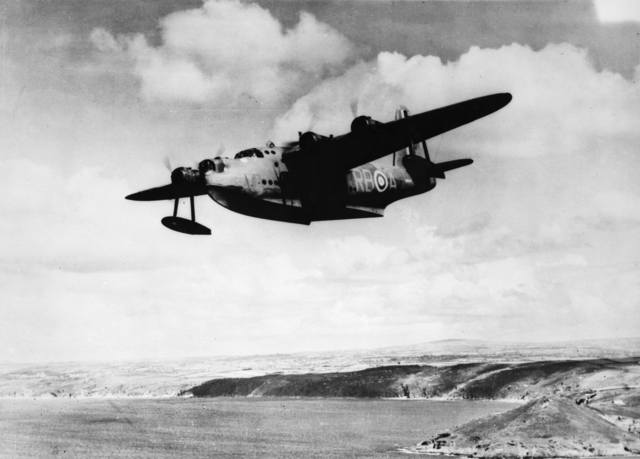
No. 10 Squadron Sunderland sets out on patrol in 1941

The squadron's major tasks during the war were escorting convoys, conducting anti-submarine patrols, and air-sea rescue. It sank its first U-boat on 1 July 1940. Operating mainly from bases in southern Britain such as RAF Mount Batten in Plymouth, the unit flew missions as far afield as Oban in Scotland, where a detachment was based between late 1940 and mid-1940, and Malta and Gibraltar in the Mediterranean Sea.

No. 10 Squadron sank a total of six U-boats between February 1940 and May 1945. It also set a Coastal Command record in February 1944 for the most patrol hours flown in a single month: 1143. The unit lost 19 aircraft during the war, most of which, according to author Norman Barnes, are thought to have been shot down by long range German fighter aircraft. In June 1945, the squadron ceased operations as part of Coastal Command and a reorganisation of RAAF units in Britain resulted in No. 466 Squadron RAAF being redesignated as No. 10 Squadron and moving to Bassingbourn, in Cambridgeshire. Following the end of hostilities in Europe, No. 10 Squadron began preparations to deploy to the Pacific Theatre; however, this was curtailed by the Japanese surrender and it remained in Britain, disbanding on 26 October 1945. Wartime casualties amounted to 161 personnel killed.

=== Post-war ===
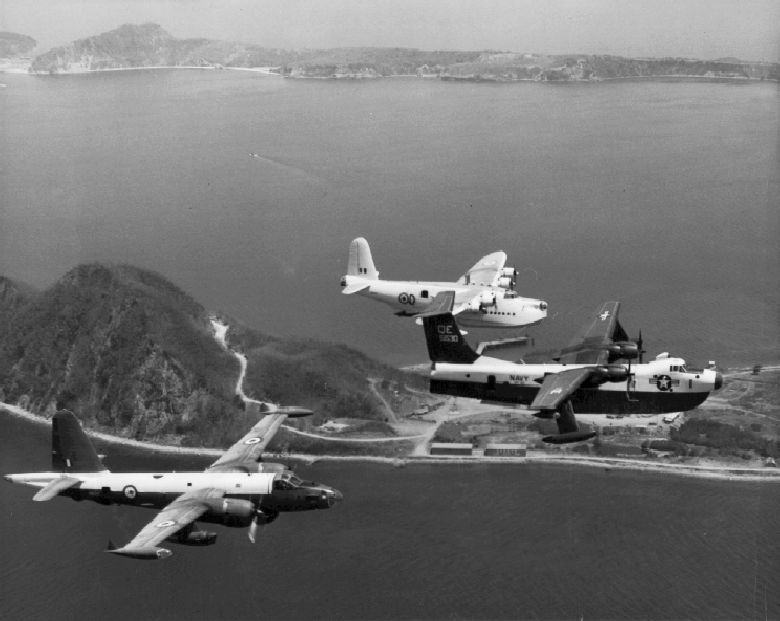
No. 10 Sqn. SP-2H with a USN P-5 and a RNZAF Sunderland in 1963

No. 10 Squadron was re-formed at Townsville on 1 March 1949 to increase the RAAF's reconnaissance capability. Operating modified Lincoln heavy bombers the squadron conducted maritime and anti-submarine patrols over northern Australia and the South Pacific. In June 1950, a detachment from the squadron was sent to Darwin to carry out search and rescue duties. The squadron continued in this role after re-equipping with Neptune aircraft in March 1962, and the longer range of the Neptune allowed the squadron to operate over South East Asia and the Central Pacific in an area that was equal to "one tenth of the world's surface".

During the Vietnam War, Neptune aircraft from No. 10 Squadron operating from U-Tapao Royal Thai Navy Airfield supported US Air Force B-52 bombing missions on an opportunity basis whilst transiting Thai airspace, using their AN/APS-120 radar to provide early warning of surface-to-air missiles. The Neptune's electronic equipment was also used during the Indonesia–Malaysia confrontation in the mid-1960s to monitor Indonesian radars. For a six-month period between June 1968 and January 1969, the squadron was commanded by a US naval officer, Lieutenant Commander J.A. Mueller.

On 1 July 1977, No. 10 Squadron became part of the newly formed No. 92 Wing RAAF. Throughout 1978–79, No. 10 Squadron was re-equipped with P-3C Orion aircraft and relocated to RAAF Base Edinburgh in South Australia. With the similarly equipped No. 11 Squadron, No. 10 Squadron continued to operate in the maritime patrol, surveillance and anti-shipping roles.

Since the 1980s, No. 10 Squadron has contributed to the RAAF maritime patrol detachment based at Butterworth Air Base in Malaysia as part of Operation Gateway. More recently, it supported the Australian-led intervention into East Timor in 1999, and contributed to the Australian maritime patrol detachment based in the Persian Gulf since 2003. In this role the squadron supported coalition operations in Afghanistan and Iraq, and undertaken border protection duties as part of Operation Resolute. In 2019, 10 Squadron was assigned to No. 42 Wing RAAF, where it continued to operate two AP-3C(EW) Orions in an electronic warfare role.

In December 2020 Wing Commander Marija Jovanovich assumed command of the squadron, becoming the third woman to lead a RAAF flying squadron. No. 10 Squadron became the first RAAF flying squadron to simultaneously have a female commanding officer and a female executive officer in 2021, when Squadron Leader Jenna Higgins took up the role.

On 4 September 2023, No. 42 Wing was disbanded and No. 10 Squadron was transferred back to No. 92 Wing.

In December 2023, the two AP-3C(EW) Orion electronic warfare aircraft flew their final mission and the type was retired from service. They are being replaced by four MC-55A Peregrine ISREW / SIGINT / ELINT aircraft.

No. 10 Squadron's first MC-55A Peregrine arrived in Australia in January 2026. The remaining three MC-55A Peregrines are scheduled to be delivered in 2026. The primary operating base for the MC-55A Peregrines will be RAAF Base Edinburgh, and they will also operate from two forward operating bases at RAAF Base Darwin and at Cocos (Keeling) Islands Airport to "project into Australia's area of interest".

== Aircraft operated ==
The squadron has operated the following aircraft:

- Short Sunderland (1939–1945)
- Supermarine Walrus Mk.I (1940)
- Short S.26 G-Boat (1941)
- Avro Lincoln (1949–1962)
- Lockheed P2V-7S Neptune (1962–1977)
- Lockheed P-3C Orion (1977–2002)
- AP-3C Orion (2002–2023)
- MC-55A Peregrine (2026 - Present)

No. 10 Squadron was also equipped with small numbers of Supermarine Seagull, Supermarine Southampton, de Havilland DH60 Moth floatplane, Consolidated Catalina and Supermarine Walrus aircraft for training purposes prior to receiving its Sunderland aircraft.
