= No. 3 Security Forces Squadron RAAF =

No. 3 Security Forces Squadron
- Branch: RAAF
- Part of: Combat Support Group
- Garrison/HQ: RAAF Base Edinburgh
- Motto(s): Resolute in Defence

No. 3 Security Forces Squadron (3SECFORSQN) was an RAAF Security Forces unit, whose mission was to provide security in support of air and space power assets and infrastructure.

== History ==
Originally designated No. 3 Airfield Defence Squadron (3AFDS), the squadron was disbanded in the mid-2000s and its resources dispersed between No 1AFDS (RAAF Edinburgh) and No 2AFDS (RAAF Amberley).

On 4 July 2013, the RAAF's security capability was reorganised. Subsequently, No. 3 Security Forces Squadron was formed, with its headquarters based at RAAF Base Edinburgh.

== Disbandment ==
On October 11th 2022, 3SECFOR was disbanded as part of the RAAF's Air Force Security Transformation program. During 2022, 1SECFOR and 2SECFOR were restructured with more specific responsibilities.

== Personnel ==
The unit comprised personnel from the following Air Force categories and musterings:

- Ground Defence Officer
- Security Police Officer
- Personnel Capability Officer
- Logistics Officer
- Airfield Defence Guard
- Air Force Security (Security Operations)
- Air Force Security (Military Working Dog Handler)
- Airbase Protection
- Personnel Capability Specialist
- Supply

== Squadron structure ==
- Squadron Headquarters. Based at RAAF Base Edinburgh, South Australia.
- RAAF Edinburgh Security Flight.
- Rifle Flight Group, comprising HQ, Rifle Flight x 2 and C4ISR Flight. Based at RAAF Base Edinburgh, South Australia.
- Airbase Protection Flight (Reserve personnel). Based at RAAF Base Edinburgh, South Australia.
- RAAF Pearce Security Flight. Based at RAAF Pearce, Western Australia.
