= Operation Gateway =

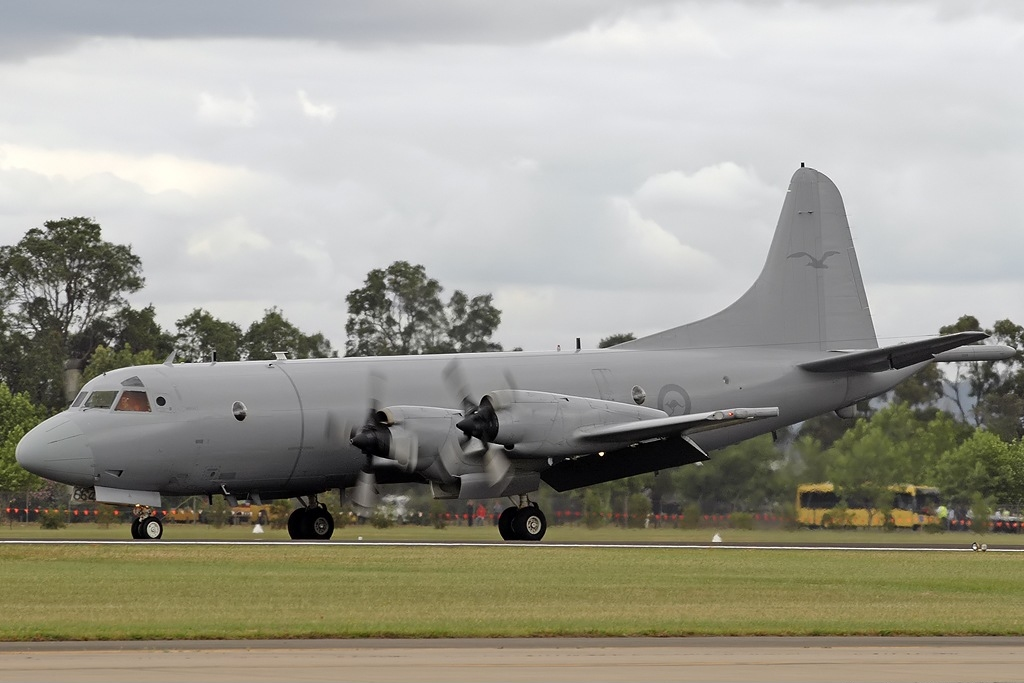
- An RAAF Lockheed AP-3C Orion
- Objective: preservation of regional security and stability in South East Asia.
- Date: 1980
- Executed by: Australian Defence Force
- Outcome: Ongoing but altered to include surveillance in the South China Sea.

Operation Gateway is an ongoing Australian Defence Force (ADF) regional security and stability operation in South East Asia.

== History ==
Commencing in 1980, the operation formed part of Australia's contribution to Western surveillance operations during the Cold War. It included the use of P-3 Orion maritime patrol aircraft and naval vessels which conducted missions in the Indian Ocean and the Strait of Malacca. Royal Australian Navy Oberon class submarines were also involved, conducting patrols as part of US "deterrence and surveillance operations against Soviet submarines". Meanwhile, the Australian Army maintained Rifle Company Butterworth at Butterworth airbase in Malaysia in order to protect allied aircraft involved in the operation.

According to Brewster, during the 1980s the primary focus of Royal Australian Air Force aircraft involved in the operation was on detecting Soviet submarines transiting the Strait of Malacca, after which they would hand over to the United States Navy. In response to Australian security concerns following the Soviet invasion of Afghanistan a detachment of up to three Orions from No. 92 Wing RAAF were deployed to Butterworth in Malaysia and began operations in February 1981. Initially the patrols involved the regular monitoring of Soviet ship and submarine movements in the region; however, the following year they began a "more aggressive prosecution phase" the following year which involved the use of radar and sonar buoys to actively detect, identify and track submarines. These patrols ended in 1989.

Since the end of the Cold War the Orions have continued to participate in maritime security operations under the Five Power Defence Arrangements, conducting patrols over the Indian Ocean, Strait of Malacca and South China Sea. As part of this operation RAAF aircraft are involved in search and rescue and counter-piracy missions, at times flying as far afield as Sri Lanka and the Philippines. They have reportedly also been involved in freedom of navigation flights. Australian aircraft reportedly deploy to Butterworth between four and eight times a year, and conduct regular flights over the period of a fortnight.
