= MC 55A Peregrine =

Electronic warfare aircraft

MC-55A Peregrine
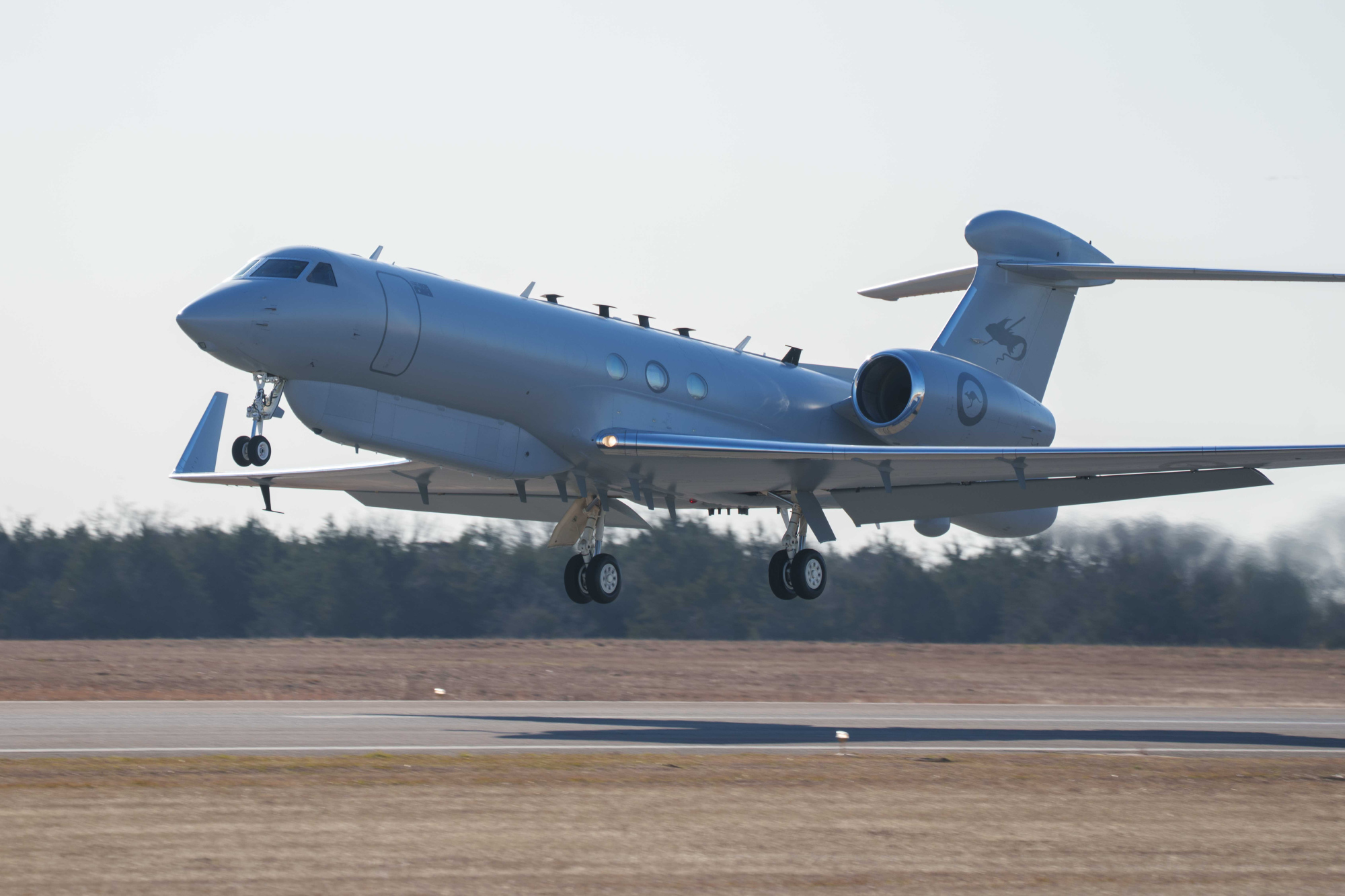
- MC‑55A Peregrine

General information
- Type: Reconnaissance aircraft
- Manufacturer: Gulfstream Aerospace (airframe) L3Harris Technologies
- Status: In service
- Primary user: Royal Australian Air Force
- Number built: 4

History
- Introduction date: 22 January 2026
- Developed from: Gulfstream G550

The MC-55A Peregrine is an airborne Intelligence, Surveillance, Reconnaissance, and Electronic Warfare (ISREW) aircraft operated by the Royal Australian Air Force (RAAF).

The aircraft is built upon a modified Gulfstream G550 business jet airframe. It was extensively modified and integrated with advanced mission intelligence systems by the prime contractor L3Harris Technologies in the United States.

== MC-55A Peregrine ==
The MC‑55A Peregrine is an intelligence, surveillance, reconnaissance, and electronic warfare aircraft developed for long‑range strategic missions. Designed as a multi-role platform, the MC‑55A integrates advanced sensor suites and secure communications, to support a wide range of operations including signals intelligence (SIGINT), electronic intelligence (ELINT), battlefield networking, and stand‑off reconnaissance.

== Design and Development ==
The MC‑55A Peregrine was conceived as a next‑generation ISR aircraft capable of operating in complex networked environments. Its airframe is based on the Gulfstream G550, allowing for extended endurance, reduced operating costs, and rapid deployment. It was modified extensively by Gulfstream and L3Harris Technologies to incorporate its mission sensors and communications systems.

Key development goals included:

- Integration of advanced mission systems for its ISREW role
- Long‑range secure communications and data‑link interoperability

The aircraft entered limited production following successful flight‑testing.

== Specifications ==
- Crew: 8
- Length: 29.4 m
- Wingspan: 28.5 m
- Powerplant: 2 × Rolls-Royce BR710 turbofan engines
- Range: 12,500 km
- Service Ceiling: 51,000 ft
- Mission Endurance: Up to 15 hours
- Primary Systems:
  - SIGINT/ELINT sensor arrays
  - Multi‑band AESA radar
  - Secure satellite communications
  - Onboard data‑processing suite
  - Ground Data Processing Systems

== Operational History ==
The MC‑55A Peregrine has been deployed in strategic reconnaissance roles, long‑range maritime surveillance, and joint‑force electronic warfare operations. Its ability to operate at stand‑off distances while collecting high‑value intelligence has made it a core asset in modern network‑centric warfare.

Notable operational characteristics include:

- Persistent ISR coverage over wide areas
- Real‑time data relay to ground and naval forces
- Ability to support joint targeting networks

== Operators ==
- Royal Australian Air Force – Primary launch customer (No. 10 Squadron)
- United States Air Force – Flight test and evaluation.

== See also ==
- AESA radar
- Gulfstream G550
