= RAAF Base Edinburgh =

Australian military airbase in South Australia

- Edinburgh, Adelaide, South Australia in Australia
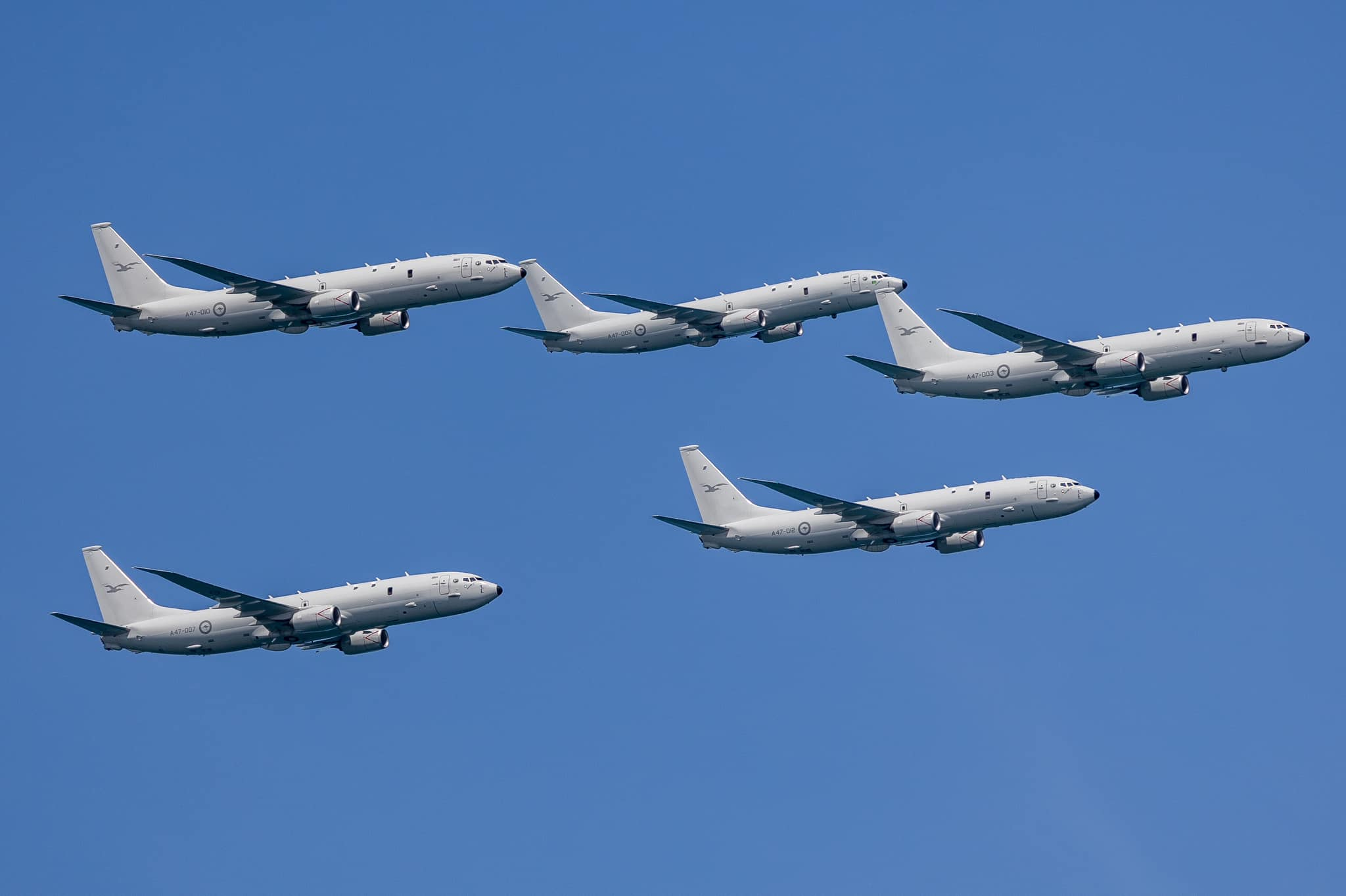
- Five P-8A Poseidons of No. 11 Squadron at RAAF Base Edinburgh.

- The crest of RAAF Edinburgh

Site information
- Type: Military air base
- Owner: Department of Defence
- Operator: Royal Australian Air Force
- Website: RAAF Base Edinburgh

Location
- Location in South Australia
- Coordinates: 34°42′09″S 138°37′15″E

Site history
- In use: 22 March 1954

Garrison information
- Occupants: Headquarters No 92 Wing; No. 453 Squadron; No. 24 (City of Adelaide) Squadron; No. 87 Squadron; No. 292 Squadron; No 3 Security Forces Squadron; No. 1 Remote Sensor Unit; No 2 Expeditionary Health Squadron Detachment Edinburgh; No 1 Combat Communication Squadron Flight Edinburgh; No. 10 Squadron; No. 11 Squadron; Joint Electronic Warfare Operational Support Unit; No. 462 Squadron; Aircraft Research and Development Unit; Institute of Aviation Medicine; 10th Brigade (2025); 1st Armoured Regiment; 16th Regiment, Royal Australian Artillery (2025); Joint Logistic Unit - South; 613 Squadron, AAFC; Headquarters No. 6 wing AAFC

Airfield information
- Identifiers: ICAO: YPED
- Elevation: 20 metres (67 ft) AMSL
Runways
| Direction | Length and surface |
|---|---|
| 04/22 | 1,962 metres (6,437 ft) Grass |
| 18/36 | 2,560 metres (8,399 ft) Asphalt |
- Sources: Australian AIP and aerodrome chart

RAAF Base Edinburgh (ICAO: YPED) is a Royal Australian Air Force (RAAF) military airbase located in Edinburgh, approximately 28 km (17 mi) north of Adelaide, South Australia, Australia and forms part of the Edinburgh Defence Precinct.

Edinburgh is one of two defence 'super bases' in Australia, home to over 3,500 personnel from both the Royal Australian Air Force and the Australian Army. The base is home to No 92. Wing and their Boeing P-8 Poseidon maritime patrol aircraft that conduct surveillance operations throughout Australia's region of interest. In addition, No. 9 Squadron at Edinburgh remotely pilot the Royal Australian Air Force's fleet of drones, such as the Northrop Grumman MQ-4C Triton, as well as a range of other undisclosed activities.

Edinburgh is notably home to the Jindalee Operational Radar Network (JORN) Coordination Centre, the RAAF Air Warfare Centre, and the Australian Battlespace Surveillance Centre, making Edinburgh one of the most strategically important defence bases in Australia. The base has over the past decade become home to elements of the 1st Brigade of the Australian Army.

== History ==
The construction of RAAF Base Edinburgh commenced in 1953 and it was officially opened 22 March 1954 as a support base for weapons development at the joint UK-Australian Weapons Research Establishment (WRE) at Woomera and Maralinga. The support base had previously been based at a small Edinburgh Airfield and at RAAF Base Mallala. The base was located alongside the wartime Salisbury Explosives Factory, in open fields between the then country villages of Salisbury (to the south) and Smithfield (to the north). At about the same time, the satellite town of Elizabeth was being established (to the east).

Support for WRE testing activities had greatly reduced by the late 1960s. In 1968, No. 11 Squadron relocated to Edinburgh operating Orions. In the late 1970s, No. 10 Squadron also operating Orions relocated to Edinburgh and a maritime patrol wing No. 92 Wing was established at Edinburgh making it the primary base for Australia's maritime reconnaissance operations. RAAF Base Edinburgh has since been home to No 1 Recruit Training Unit, the Institute of Aviation Medicine (AVMED) and the Aircraft Research and Development Unit (ARDU).

Originally, RAAF Base Edinburgh and the DSTO were located in Salisbury, (subsequently the suburb of Salisbury – Postcode 5108), in the City of Salisbury. In 1997, the Department of Defence decided to rationalise the then "DSTO Salisbury" site and sell off about 70% of the site, and surrounding "Defence-owned" Crown land, to form the "Edinburgh Parks" industrial estate. The suburb of Salisbury was split in two, with the part containing the RAAF Base and DSTO renamed "Edinburgh" (after the RAAF Base). The new suburb was assigned the Postcode 5111.

On 5 December 2003, stage one of the redevelopment of the base was opened including facilities for the newly formed Aerospace Operational Support Group, and for the Aircraft Research and Development Unit which had relocated from DSTO Salisbury, and for Defence Materiel Organisation units - the Maritime Patrol System Program office and the Aeronautical Life Support Logistics Management Unit.

In August 2012, stage two of the redevelopment of the base was completed including a new air traffic control tower and facilities for No. 462 Squadron, which had relocated from Canberra, and for No. 87 Squadron.

On 19 November 2017, Minister for Defence Marise Payne and Minister for Defence Industry Christopher Pyne announced that the base would be upgraded to operate the P-8A Poseidon including new facilities, infrastructure and airfield works with a strengthened and extended runway (by 275 metres (902 ft)).

On 9 and 10 November 2019, the base held the 'Edinburgh Air Show 2019'.

In May 2023, it was revealed that the 16th Regiment, Royal Australian Artillery would be relocating from their Woodside Barracks to purpose-built facilities at Edinburgh once completed, to accommodate the new NASAMS ground-based air defence systems.

On 5 September 2024, construction began on a $200m 'Deep Maintaince and Modification Facility' at Edinburgh to support the long-term maintaince, sustainment, and modification of the Royal Australian Air Force's P-8A Poseidon and E-7A Wedgetail fleet. Expected completion in 2026.

=== Environmental contamination ===
In 2016 concerns were raised about perfluorooctane sulfonate (PFOS) and perfluorooctanoic acid (PFOA), used in fire fighting foams at the base until 2004, being found in groundwater at the base and in nearby wetlands. A 2014 report from the United States Environmental Protection Agency described PFOA and PFOS as emergent contaminants that are "extremely persistent in the environment and resistant to typical environmental degradation processes" and which consequently pose "potential adverse effects for the environment and human health" due to their toxicity, mobility, and ability to bioaccumulate.

== Current Air Force units ==
| Unit | Full name | Force Element Group | Aircraft | Notes |
|---|---|---|---|---|
| HQ92WG | Headquarters No 92 Wing | Surveillance and Response Group | | |
| 10SQN | No. 10 Squadron | Surveillance and Response Group | AP-3C Orion maritime patrol aircraft | |
| 11SQN | No. 11 Squadron | Surveillance and Response Group | Boeing P-8A Poseidon maritime patrol aircraft | |
| 292SQN | No. 292 Squadron | Surveillance and Response Group | | Operational conversion unit |
| 1RSU | No. 1 Remote Sensor Unit | Surveillance and Response Group | | Jindalee Operational Radar Network |
| 453SQN EDN FLT | No. 453 Squadron Edinburgh Flight | Surveillance and Response Group | | Air traffic control |
| 24SQN | No. 24 (City of Adelaide) Squadron | Combat Support Group | | Airbase support |
| 3SECFOR SQN | No 3 Security Forces Squadron | Combat Support Group | | |
| 1CCS EDN FLT | No 1 Combat Communication Squadron Flight Edinburgh | Combat Support Group | | |
| 2EHS DET EDN | No 2 Expeditionary Health Squadron Detachment Edinburgh | Combat Support Group | | |
| | Headquarters Air Warfare Centre | Air Warfare Centre | | |
| | Air Force Ranges Directorate | Air Warfare Centre | | |
| AWR | Air Force Air Weapon Ranges | Air Warfare Centre | | |
| AFTRSQN | Air Force Test Range Squadron | Air Warfare Centre | | |
| | Live, Virtual and Constructive (LVC) simulation | Air Warfare Centre | | |
| | Information Warfare Directorate | Air Warfare Centre | | |
| JEWOSU | Joint Electronic Warfare Operational Support Unit | Air Warfare Centre | | |
| 87SQN | No. 87 Squadron | Air Warfare Centre | | |
| 462SQN | No. 462 Squadron | Air Warfare Centre | | Cyber warfare/Information security |
| AITU | Air Intelligence Training Unit | Air Warfare Centre | | |
| | Tactics and Training Directorate | Air Warfare Centre | | |
| 88SQN | No. 88 Squadron | Air Warfare Centre | | |
| | Air Warfare School | Air Warfare Centre | | |
| | Test and Evaluation Directorate | Air Warfare Centre | | |
| ARDU | Aircraft Research and Development Unit | Air Warfare Centre | | |
| AWESQN | Air Warfare Engineering Squadron | Air Warfare Centre | | |
| IAM | Institute of Aviation Medicine | Air Warfare Centre | | |
Cadet Units
| HQ6WG | 6 Wing - Headquarters | Australian Air Force Cadets | | Cadet Headquarters Unit |
| 613SQN | 613 Squadron - Edinburgh | Australian Air Force Cadets | | Cadet Unit |

== Army 1st Brigade ==
The Hardened and Networked Army plan was announced in December 2005 to relocate elements of the Australian Army's 1st Brigade to RAAF Base Edinburgh which was later altered by the Enhanced Land Force plan released in August 2006 changing the mechanised infantry battalion to be relocated. An extensive building program was undertaken to provide new working accommodation and joint Army and RAAF training facilities, a combined mess, fitness, health and community facilities. On 9 September 2011, the new facilities were officially opened with the 7th Battalion, Royal Australian Regiment (7 RAR) a mechanised infantry battalion housed at Horseshoe Lines. 7 RAR had relocated from Robertson Barracks in Darwin earlier in the year in January. The new facilities housed other relocated units including the 102nd (Coral) Battery from 8th/12th Regiment, Royal Australian Artillery, 9th Field Squadron from 1st Combat Engineer Regiment, 1st Combat Services Support Team from 1st Combat Service Support Battalion and a detachment from Headquarters 1st Brigade.

In November 2017, the 1st Armoured Regiment relocated from Robertson Barracks to Chauvel Lines at RAAF Base Edinburgh as part of the Plan Beersheba reorganisation of the Army. D Squadron had earlier relocated in January 2014.

=== Current Army units ===
The following units are based at RAAF Base Edinburgh:

- 1st Brigade Headquarters (Southern Detachment)
  - 1st Armoured Regiment
    - Headquarters Squadron
    - A Squadron – Cavalry (equipped with the ASLAV)
    - B Squadron – Tank (equipped with the M1A1 Abrams)
    - C Squadron – Cavalry (equipped with the ASLAV)
    - Support Squadron
  - 1st Combat Service Support Team (1st Combat Service Support Battalion)

== See also ==
- Structure of the Royal Australian Air Force
- Australian Defence Basketball Association
- List of airports in South Australia
- List of Royal Australian Air Force installations
