= No. 11 Squadron RAAF =

Royal Australian Air Force squadron

No.11 Squadron RAAF
- No. 11 Squadron's crest
- Active: 1939–current
- Country: Australia
- Branch: Royal Australian Air Force
- Role: Maritime patrol
- Part of: No. 92 Wing RAAF
- Garrison/HQ: RAAF Base Edinburgh
- Motto: "Shepherd or Destroy"
- Engagements: World War II; Vietnam War; East Timor; Iraq; Afghanistan

Aircraft flown
- Patrol: P-8A Poseidon

No. 11 Squadron is a Royal Australian Air Force (RAAF) maritime patrol squadron based at RAAF Base Edinburgh, South Australia. It was formed in 1939 and has seen active service in World War II, East Timor, the war on terrorism and the 2003 Gulf War. The squadron became known to the public through its participation in the Great Southern Ocean rescues of wrecked sailors, such as Tony Bullimore and Isabelle Autissier.

== History ==
=== Second World War ===
No. 11 Squadron was established on 25 September 1939 at RAAF Station Richmond, New South Wales. It was equipped with two Supermarine Seagulls and two Short Empire flying boats. The squadron's first commanding officer was Flight Lieutenant James Alexander. In late September, the squadron deployed to Port Moresby in New Guinea, where it monitored Japanese shipping movements in the region. In mid-1940, the squadron received another two Empires as it began to expand its operations to places such as Thursday Island and Bougainville. The squadron was re-equipped with six Consolidated Catalina aircraft in 1941, before transferring some of its aircraft to No. 20 Squadron RAAF. In late November, the squadron helped search for survivors from HMAS Sydney following its battle with the German auxiliary cruiser Kormoran, but was unsuccessful.

Upon the outbreak of war with Japan in December 1941, No. 11 Squadron began flying long-range patrols across the South West Pacific area; these would continue throughout the war and would sometimes be up to 20 hours in duration. It suffered its first loss on 8 December when one of its aircraft crashed on take-off in Port Moresby; all six crew members were killed. On 12 January, the squadron launched an attack on the Japanese airbase at Truk, but it was abandoned due to bad weather. Further raids were undertaken throughout the next couple of months around Rabaul and patrols were undertaken along the north coast of New Guinea during which the squadron lost one aircraft shot down and several others damaged in attacks or in accidents. The squadron also flew evacuation missions, repatriating military personnel and civilians back to Australia as the Japanese attacks intensified. In May, following the Japanese air attacks on Port Moresby, the squadron was withdrawn to Australia, arriving in Bowen, Queensland, from where it flew reconnaissance sorties in support of Allied naval operations during the Battle of the Coral Sea. Throughout the remainder of the year, the squadron undertook anti-submarine and anti-shipping patrols, and several bombing missions in New Guinea during which one Catalina was lost.

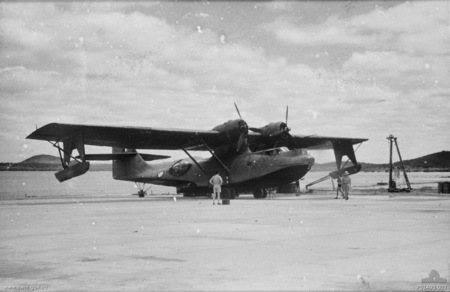
No. 11 Squadron Catalina being beached for maintenance in 1943

The squadron moved to Cairns, Queensland in November 1942, and began to interdict Japanese supply convoys moving between Lae and Finschhafen. In early March 1943, aircraft from No. 11 Squadron took part in the surveillance of the Japanese convoy that was destroyed in the Battle of the Bismarck Sea. In April, No. 11 Squadron began conducting offensive mine-laying operations, which it continued until the end of the war. The squadron's most notable achievement in this role was the mining of Manila harbour in December 1944, which required three aircraft to fly over 14,500 kilometres (9,000 mi) in the RAAF's longest mission of the war.

An incident in which a US Navy Wildcat mistook a No. 11 Squadron Catalina for a Japanese aircraft resulted in the adoption of what became the modern RAAF Roundel. At the time, RAAF aircraft were using the RAF roundel and the USN aircraft mistook this for the Japanese red circular aircraft marking. The aftermath led to the removal of the red colour from the centre of the roundel, which remained as the standard RAAF roundel in the Pacific for the remainder of the war. Post-war, the standard RAF roundel was reinstated; the current roundel consisting of the blue outer ring surrounding a red kangaroo in motion was adopted in June 1956.

The squadron spent the final months of the war conducting mine-laying operations, including in Balikpapan Harbour. After Japan surrendered in August 1945, its focus shifted to humanitarian efforts, air dropping supplies to Allied personnel in prisoner-of-war camps, and repatriating newly liberated POWs back to Australia. These operations occupied the squadron until the end of 1945; it was subsequently withdrawn to Australia and officially disbanded on 15 February 1946. Casualties during the war totalled 102 personnel killed.

=== Post-war ===
On 1 July 1948, No. 11 Squadron was re-formed at RAAF Base Rathmines, New South Wales, drawing personnel and aircraft from the former Search and Rescue Wing. At this time it operated Catalinas again, undertaking search and rescue and courier tasks. In September that year, the squadron lost one aircraft in a crash on Lord Howe Island during a night navigation exercise, resulting in the deaths of seven of the nine crewmembers. The squadron ceased operations on 1 May 1950 and was briefly disbanded between then and 1 November 1950, when it re-formed at RAAF Base Amberley, Queensland, operating modified Avro Lincoln heavy bombers. Two weeks later, the squadron was transferred to RAAF Base Pearce, Western Australia, where it conducted patrols over the Indian Ocean. It was re-equipped with Lockheed P-2 Neptune aircraft during 1951–53, sending crews to the United States to fly the aircraft back, and in May 1954 the squadron re-located to RAAF Base Richmond.

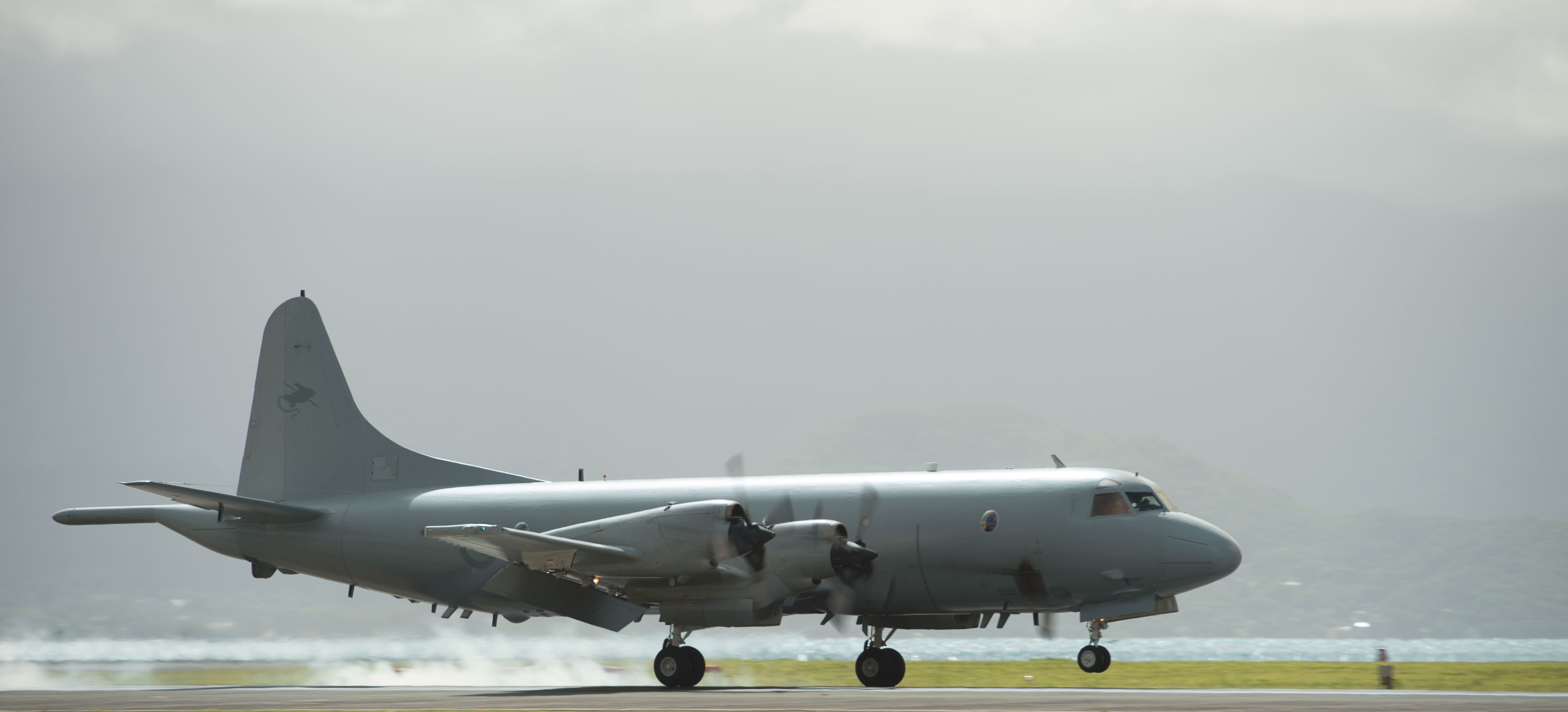
No. 11 Squadron AP-3C Orion in 2016

Neptunes from the squadron flew around the world in February 1957 as part of Operation Westbound. In 1959, the squadron's Neptunes were flown to the United States and upgraded with jet engines; one aircraft was lost in a crash near Richmond early that year, resulting in the deaths of the entire crew. In February 1964, the squadron returned to the search and rescue role when it helped search for survivors following the Melbourne–Voyager collision. The following year, the squadron deployed five aircraft as escorts when HMAS Sydney was dispatched to South Vietnam carrying equipment and troops including the 1st Battalion, Royal Australian Regiment and the Prince of Wales's Light Horse as part of Australia's contribution to the Vietnam War.

The last squadron's last Neptune flight took place in late 1967. In February 1968, No. 11 Squadron moved to RAAF Base Edinburgh, South Australia, where it re-equipped with P-3B Orion aircraft over the next six months, dispatching crews to the United States to retrieve the aircraft. From early 1981, the squadron's aircraft were dispatched regularly to RAAF Base Butterworth in Malaysia as part of No. 92 Wing. Between 1984 and 1986, the old-model Orions were replaced with P-3Cs. Six P-3B Orions sold to Portuguese Air Force as P-3P Orions.

No. 11 Squadron continues to operate in the maritime patrol and surveillance roles. In this role, the squadron has taken part in several high-profile rescues of wrecked sailors in the Great Southern Ocean, including those of Tony Bullimore and Isabelle Autissier. In 1999, the squadron supported the Australian-led intervention into East Timor as part of Operation Warden. Between 2003 and 2013, the squadron's aircraft deployed to the Middle East as part of No. 92 Wing's commitment to Operations Catalyst, Falconer and Slipper. One of the squadron's main roles during these operations was the provision of "over-ground surveillance", providing real-time reconnaissance information to Coalition ground troops in Iraq and Afghanistan, under the direction of ground controllers.

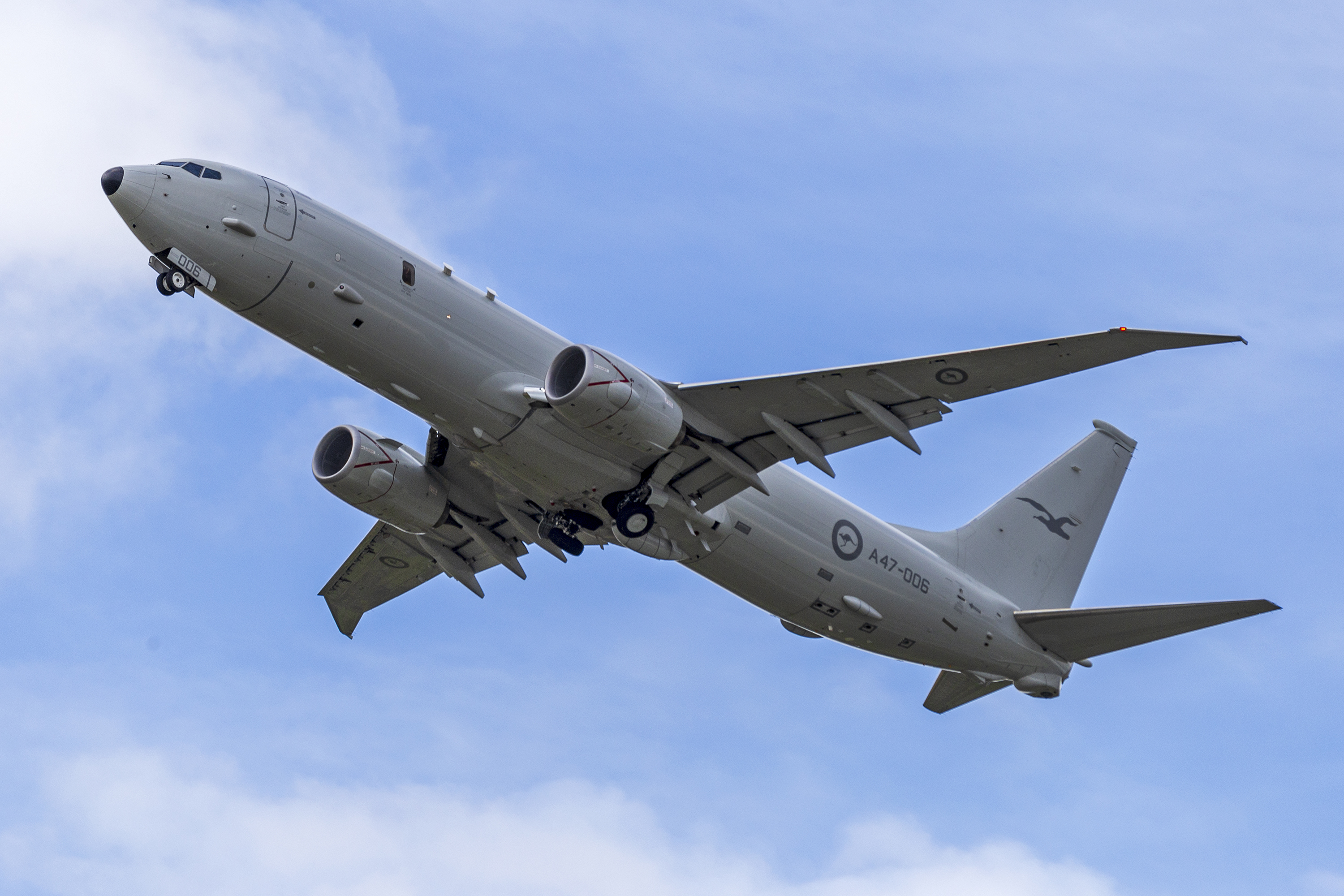
No. 11 Squadron P-8A Poseidon in 2021

In May 2015, it was announced that the squadron would begin transitioning from Orions to Boeing P-8 Poseidons. The first aircraft was delivered in November 2016 and as of June 2017 the squadron was operating three P-8As. In April 2018, a No. 11 Squadron Poseidon was deployed to Japan to conduct maritime surveillance to prevent sanctions evasions by North Korea as part of Operation Argos. There have been several subsequent deployments. In October 2019, a Poseidon was deployed to the Middle East in support of a US-led International Maritime Security Construct, which includes forces from the US, Saudi Arabia, Bahrain and the UK. The squadron took delivery of its twelfth Poseidon in December.

In January 2020, during the Australia-wide bushfires, a No. 11 Squadron Poseidon was utilised under the Emergency Defence Assistance to the Civil Community role as a surveillance asset for Operation Bushfire Assist. On 26 May 2022, during a Defence Force maritime surveillance mission, a Poseidon later identified as A47-008, callsign ASY-189, was intercepted by a PLAAF J-16 fighter jet in International Airspace over the South China Sea. The Defence Minister stated that the J-16 deployed flares and chaff that was ingested into the P-8A's engine.

== Aircraft operated ==
No. 11 Squadron RAAF has operated the following aircraft:

- Short Empire (1939–1941)
- Supermarine Seagull (1939–1941)
- Consolidated Catalina (1941–1950)
- Avro Lincoln (1950–1951)
- Lockheed P2V-5S Neptune (1951–1968)
- Lockheed P-3B Orion (1968–1986)
- Lockheed P-3C Orion (1986–2002)
- AP-3C Orion (2002–2016)
- Boeing P-8A Poseidon (2016–current)
