= RAF Yeadon =

Royal Air Force base in Yorkshire

RAF Yeadon
- Yeadon, Bradford in England
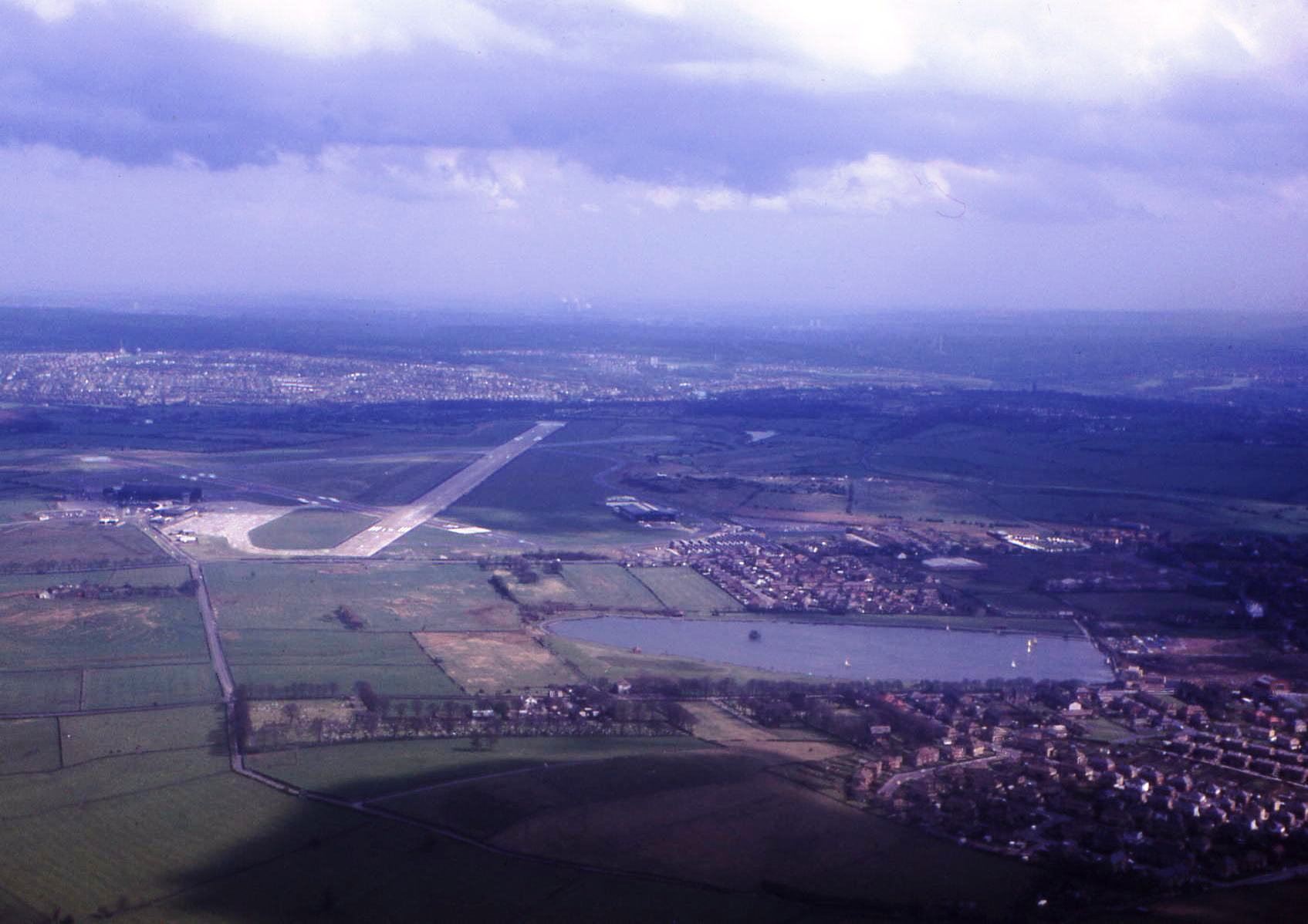

Site information
- Type: Military airfield
- Owner: Air Ministry
- Operator: Royal Air Force
- Controlled by: RAF Bomber Command; RAF Fighter Command; RAF Flying Training Command
- Open to the public: Yes - for public flights
- Condition: Extant

Location
- Coordinates: 53.867°N 1.662°W
- Grid reference: SE222410

Site history
- Built: 1939 – 1957

Airfield information
- Elevation: 669 feet (204 m) AMSL

RAF Yeadon was a Royal Air Force flying station at Yeadon, in leeds in West Yorkshire, England. The site was used in the Second World War and by some flying squadrons after the war had ended. It is now known as Leeds Bradford Airport. Civilian flying activity ceased during wartime and the airfield was requisitioned for military use, though normal RAF use ceased by 1941, with the site mostly being used for training or by ferry pool pilots flying aircraft out from the adjacent aircraft factory. No. 609 Squadron used the site between 1936 and 1939, and they returned after the war but had left the site again by 1950, and the RAF permanently vacated the airfield by 1957.

== History ==
The airfield at Yeadon was opened in 1931 at a height of 669 feet (204 m) (Note: Various heights are offered from different sources, such as 653 feet (199 m) (Myers), 681 feet (208 m) (ABCT), and 682 feet (208 m) (Laming). The stated height of 669 feet (204 m) is taken from an Ordnance Survey map which shows that a point where the newer 14/32 runway intersects with the old north/south runway is the highest point.) above sea level, and is 7 miles (11 km) north-west of Leeds, and 6 miles (9.7 km) north-east of Bradford. At first the site was a grassed field that covered 60 acres (24 ha) and had minimal facilities. The first significant RAF presence came in the form of No. 609 Squadron RAuxAF, which formed at Yeadon on 10 February 1936, with temporary hangars at the north-western corner of the airfield. Originally, 609 Squadron formed as a light bomber unit, and so was assigned to Bomber Command, but by December 1938, the squadron had transferred to Fighter Command. The outbreak of war saw a curtailment of civilian aircraft flights and most aerodromes and airfields were requisitioned for military flying, which included Yeadon. The base was allocated to No. 13 Group by the Royal Air Force, and was then later moved into No. 12 Group until 1941 under Fighter Command.

No. 51 Group Communications moved their headquarters to RAF Yeadon in August 1939, having formed at Hendon some three months earlier. By 1940, the RAF footprint had increased exponentially with the intention of building five Bellman hangars, and new accommodation huts had been erected. A watchtower was built in 1940, which had a good overall sight of the airfield area. The site was predominantly used as a scatter airfield for Whitley Armstrong aircraft of No.s 51 and 58 Squadrons, based at RAF Driffield and RAF Linton-on-Ouse respectively. No. 4 Bomber Group Central Maintenance Organisation formed at Yeadon on 6 October 1940 to carry out repairs and overhauls on the Whitleys belonging to No. 4 Group of Bomber Command.

Fighter Command had found that the site was too far north to be of any use during the first year of the war, so by early 1941, it was turned over to No. 51 Group RAF, part of Flying Training Command. With the completion of the aircraft factory, the site was handed over to the Ministry of Aircraft Production, with the flying training activities becoming a lodger unit. (Note: In United Kingdom military parlance, a lodger unit is one that does not belong to the administrative hierarchy of the base that it is located on. For example, at RAF Leeming in North Yorkshire is JFACTSU, but they are part of the Joint Force Air Component Headquarters based in Air Command at RAF High Wycombe.) No. 20 Elementary Flying Training School (EFTS) formed at Yeadon in 1941, with Tiger Moths being sent in from No. 12 EFTS at Prestwick which had been disbanded. Training of pilots carried on until January 1942, when No. 20 EFTS was disbanded. The EFTS had trained over 250 pilots during its tenure, and responsibility for the airfield and the environs, was handed over to Blackburn Aircraft Factory, who had a presence with the aircraft factory at the northern end of the site.

In January 1947, the base was handed over to the Ministry of Civil Aviation who resumed club flying and domestic airlines, initially to the Isle of Man. The final RAF involvement was No. 1964 Flight of 664 Squadron, which departed in March 1957.

No badge was issued for RAF Yeadon, but there are two memorials inside the terminal building that commemorate the time period that No. 609 Squadron spent at the site.

== Shadow factory ==
In 1940, the Ministry of Aircraft Production (MAP) built a shadow factory just to the north of the airfield and set about forming the site to be a launch airfield for new aircraft. Extensive effort was made into keeping the site of the factory a secret from aerial observation; grassed banks were built up on all sides at a 45 degree angle, a duck pond and fake animals were placed upon the roof (which were moved from time to time), the pattern of the fields before the factory's construction was painted out on the roof, and the hedges and trees were foliated or de-foliated depending upon the time of year. The factory had a floorspace of 1,514,190 square feet (140,673 m^{2}), and was thought to be the largest factory under a single roof and free-standing structure in Europe. A 30-foot (9.1 m) roadway was built connecting the factory with the airfield so that aircraft could be towed onto the runway and flown out of the base directly. Even with a large number of outgoing flights, the base never had a Ferry Pool flight assigned to it, with flying duties falling to No. 7 Ferry Pilots Pool based at RAF Sherburn-in-Elmet.

The factory was producing 130 Ansons a month, and it total over the course of the war, it had produced over 4,000 Ansons with enough spares for 900 more. The factory also produced 668 Lancasters, and an additional small number of Yorks and Lincolns. Work at the factory ceased in August 1946, with the last aircraft being delivered on the 16th of that month.

== Based units ==
The following military units were based at RAF Yeadon:

Units based at RAF Yeadon
Units	Dates	Details	Ref
No. 4 Bomber Group Central Maintenance Organisation	6 October 1940 – March 1941	Formed at Yeadon, moved to Dishforth, then Clifton	
No. 6 AACU			
No. 9 Air Experience Flight	8 September 1958	Became a flight within the Yorkshire University Air Squadron	
No. 20 Elementary Flying Training School	1 March 1941 – 9 January 1942	Formed and disbanded at Yeadon	
No. 23 Gliding School	May 1943 –	Formed at Yeadon	
No. 51 Group Communications Flight	January 1940 – 14 July 1947	Formed and disbanded at Yeadon	
No. 609 Squadron	10 February 1936 – 27 August 1939; 5 November 1946 – 18 October 1950	Formed at RAF Yeadon in 1936, departed for Catterick in September 1939	
No. 1964 Reserve Air Observation Post Flight	1 September 1949 – 10 March 1957	Formed as a flight of No, 664 Squadron, based at Andover	
No. 3609 Fighter Control Unit (West Riding)	22 September 1948 – 31 January 1961		
Leeds University Air Squadron	22 April 1947 – 1 may 1948; 18 March 1954 – 2 November 1959	Later moved to Church Fenton (Note: Leeds University Air Squadron merged with Hull University Air Squadron in March 1969 to become Yorkshire Universities Air Squadron (YUAS).)	

== Notable personnel ==
- Geoffrey Ambler, officer commanding No. 609 Squadron at Yeadon from 1938 to 1939
- John Dundas, fighter pilot, joined 609 Squadron whilst they were at Yeadon
