= St Mary the Virgin's Church, Church Fenton =

Church in North Yorkshire, England

Coordinates: 53°49′29″N 1°13′13″W

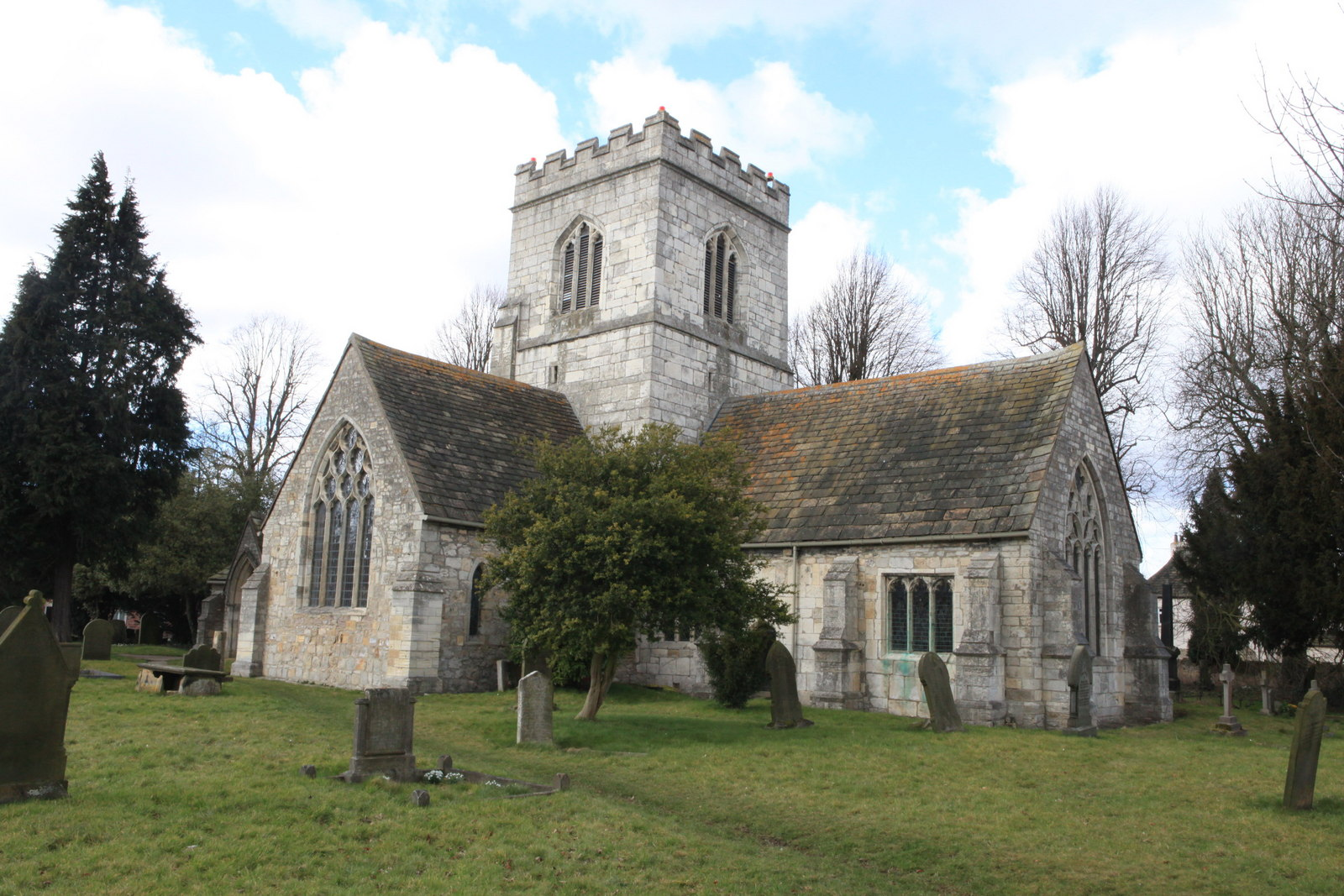
The church, seen from the south-east, in 2010

St Mary the Virgin's Church is the parish church of Church Fenton, a village south of Tadcaster in North Yorkshire, in England.

== History ==
Much of the church dates from the 13th century, the oldest parts from about 1230. A tower was added in 1240. The church was originally dedicated to John the Baptist, but later rededicated to the Virgin Mary. There were various additions in the 14th century, and in the 15th century, further changes included the construction of a replacement tower. The church was restored in 1844 by George Fowler Jones. Stained glass was added in 1859, designed by W. and T. Hodgson, and again in 1929, designed by C. E. Steel. The church was further restored in 1966 by George Pace, and was Grade I listed in 1967.

== Architecture ==
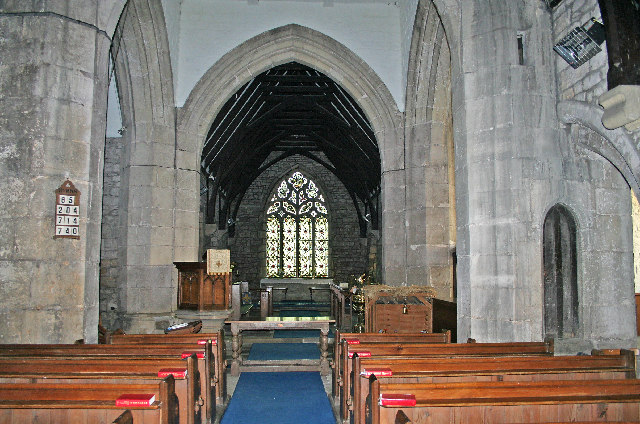
View from the nave to the chancel, in 2006

The church is built of limestone, and has a slate roof. It is a particularly small cruciform church, with a tower over the crossing. The nave is three bays long, and the chancel and both north and south transepts are of two bays. On the south side of the nave is a porch, and two lancet windows, while the south side of the chancel has a priest's door, and the south transepts has a five-light window. There is a blocked doorway on the north side of the nave, while the east window is of four lights. The tower is fitted with aircraft warning lights because of the nearby Leeds East Airport.

Inside, the nave is arcaded with octagonal columns, and the west arch of the crossing has a small door which leads to a staircase to the tower. There is an ogee-headed niche in the south transept, which would have originally housed an effigy. Monuments include a 14th-century effigy of a woman, found in 1844, locally known as "Amy Ryder", although there is no evidence for this name. There is a stone coffin which is probably Roman, but has also been described as a Mediaeval child's coffin. Two further Mediaeval coffins are visible through an inspection panel in the floor. The bowl of the 13th-century font is also on display. The altar is again Mediaeval, and there is a 13th-century piscina. There are two Jacobean chairs, a 17th-century oak table, and a 15th-century screen which now hides a modern kitchen.

== See also ==
- Grade I listed buildings in North Yorkshire (district)
- Listed buildings in Church Fenton
