= Sound barrier =

Sudden increase of undesirable effects when an aircraft approaches the speed of sound

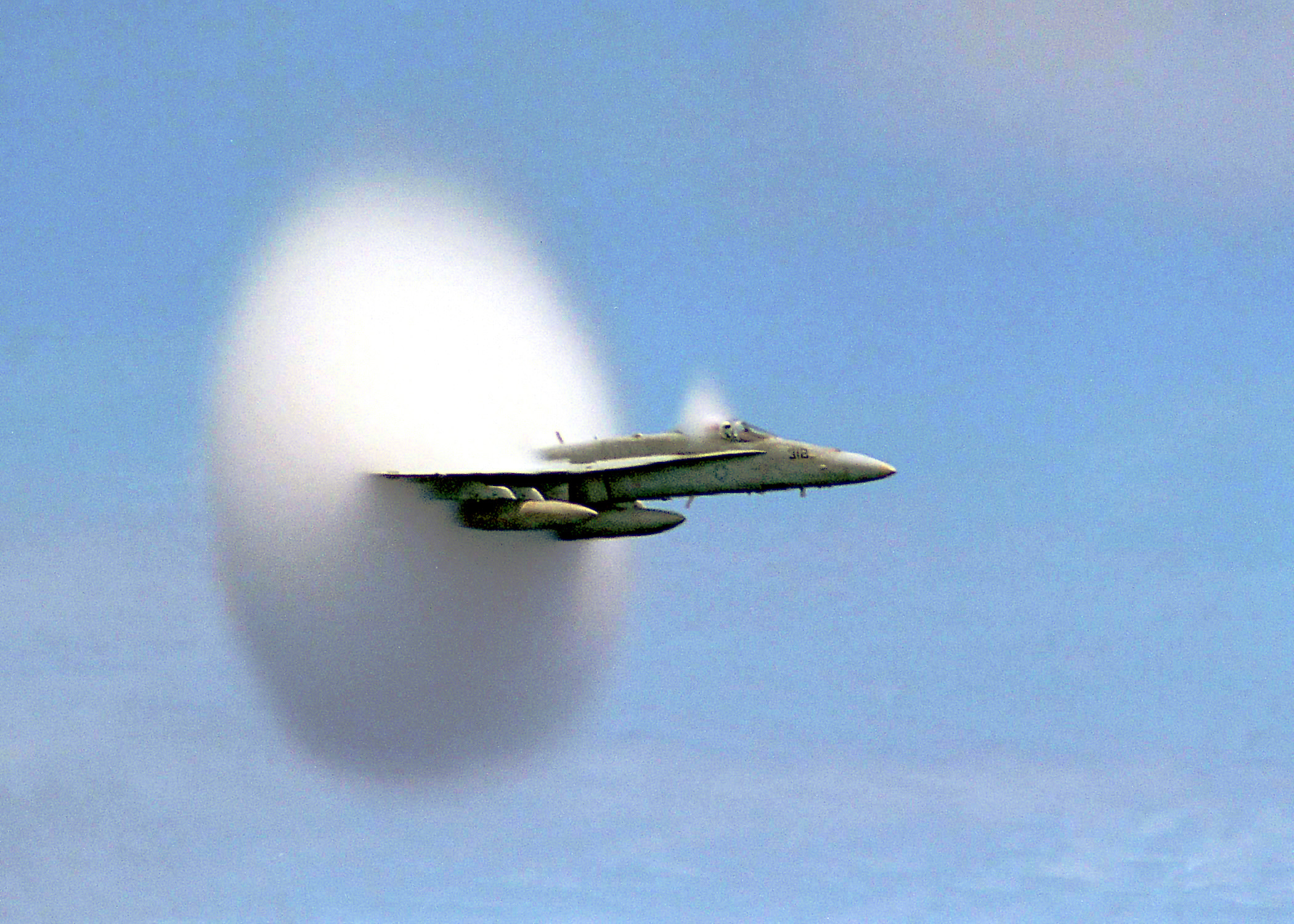
U.S. Navy F/A-18 transonic pushing into the sound barrier. The supersonic white cloud is formed by decreased air pressure and temperature around the tail of the aircraft (see Prandtl–Glauert singularity).

1. Subsonic; 2. Mach 1; 3. Supersonic; 4. Shock wave

The sound barrier or sonic barrier is the large increase in aerodynamic drag and other undesirable effects experienced by an aircraft or other object when it approaches the speed of sound. When aircraft first approached the speed of sound, these effects were seen as constituting a barrier, making faster speeds very difficult or impossible. The term sound barrier is still sometimes used today to refer to aircraft approaching supersonic flight in this high drag regime. Flying faster than sound produces a sonic boom.

In dry air at 20 °C (68 °F), the speed of sound is 343 meters per second (about 767 mph, 1234 km/h or 1,125 ft/s). The term came into use during World War II when pilots of high-speed fighter aircraft experienced the effects of compressibility, a number of adverse aerodynamic effects that deterred further acceleration, seemingly impeding flight at speeds close to the speed of sound. These difficulties represented a barrier to flying at faster speeds. In 1947, American test pilot Chuck Yeager demonstrated that safe flight at the speed of sound was achievable in purpose-designed aircraft, thereby breaking the barrier. By the 1950s, new designs of fighter aircraft routinely reached the speed of sound, and faster. (Note: See "Speed of sound" for the science behind the speed called the sound barrier, and "Sonic boom" for information on the sound associated with supersonic flight.)

== History ==
Some common whips such as the bullwhip or stockwhip are able to move faster than sound: the tip of the whip exceeds this speed and causes a sharp crack—literally a sonic boom. Firearms made after the 19th century generally have a supersonic muzzle velocity.

The sound barrier may have been first breached by living beings about 150 million years ago. Some paleobiologists report that computer models of their biomechanical capabilities suggest that certain long-tailed dinosaurs such as Brontosaurus, Apatosaurus, and Diplodocus could flick their tails at supersonic speeds, creating a cracking sound. This finding is theoretical and disputed by others in the field. Meteorites in the Earth's upper atmosphere usually travel at higher than Earth's escape velocity, which is much faster than sound.

=== Early problems ===
The existence of the sound barrier was evident to aerodynamicists before any direct in-aircraft evidence was available. In particular, the very simple theory of thin airfoils at supersonic speeds produced a curve that went to infinite drag at Mach 1, dropping with increasing speed. This could be seen in tests using projectiles fired from guns, a common method for checking the stability of various projective shapes. As the projectile slowed from its initial speed and began to approach the speed of sound, it would undergo a rapid increase in drag and slow much more rapidly. It was understood that the drag did not go infinite, or it would be impossible for the projectile to get above Mach 1 in the first place, but there was no better theory, and data was matching theory to some degree. At the same time, ever-increasing wind tunnel speeds were showing a similar effect as one approached Mach 1 from below. In this case, however, there was no theoretical development that suggested why this might be. What was noticed was that the increase in drag was not smooth, it had a distinct "corner" where it began to suddenly rise. This speed was different for different wing planforms and cross sections, and became known as the "critical Mach".

According to British aerodynamicist W. F. Hilton, of Armstrong Whitworth Aircraft, the term itself was created accidentally. He was giving demonstrations at the annual show day at the National Physical Laboratory in 1935 where he demonstrated a chart of wind tunnel measurements comparing the drag of a wing to the velocity of the air. During these explanations he would state "See how the resistance of a wing shoots up like a barrier against higher speed, as we approach the speed of sound." The next day, the London newspapers were filled with statements about a "sound barrier." Whether or not this is the first use of the term is debatable, but by the 1940s use within the industry was already common.

By the late 1930s, one practical outcome of this was becoming clear. Although aircraft were still operating well below Mach 1, generally half that at best, their engines were rapidly pushing past 1,000 hp. At these power levels, the traditional two-bladed propellers were clearly showing rapid increases in drag. The tip speed of a propeller blade is a function of the rotational speed and the length of the blade. As the engine power increased, longer blades were needed to apply this power to the air while operating at the most efficient RPM of the engine. The velocity of the air is also a function of the forward speed of the aircraft. When the aircraft speed is high enough, the tips reach transonic speeds. Shock waves form at the blade tips and sap the shaft power driving the propeller. To maintain thrust, the engine power must replace this loss, and must also match the aircraft drag as it increases with speed. The required power is so great that the size and weight of the engine becomes prohibitive. This speed limitation led to research into jet engines, notably by Frank Whittle in England and Hans von Ohain in Germany. This also led to propellers with ever-increasing numbers of blades: three, four and then five were seen during the war. As the problem became better understood, it also led to "paddle bladed" propellers with increased chord, as seen (for example) on late-war models of the Republic P-47 Thunderbolt.

Nevertheless, propeller aircraft were able to approach their critical Mach number, different for each aircraft, in a dive. Doing so led to numerous crashes for a variety of reasons. Flying the Mitsubishi Zero, pilots sometimes flew at full power into terrain because the rapidly increasing forces acting on the control surfaces of their aircraft overpowered them. In this case, several attempts to fix it only made the problem worse. Likewise, the flexing caused by the low torsional stiffness of the Supermarine Spitfire's wings caused them, in turn, to counteract aileron control inputs, leading to a condition known as control reversal. This was solved in later models with changes to the wing. Worse still, a particularly dangerous interaction of the airflow between the wings and tail surfaces of diving Lockheed P-38 Lightnings made "pulling out" of dives difficult; in one 1941 test flight, test pilot Ralph Virde was killed when the plane flew into the ground at high speed. The problem was later solved by the addition of a "dive flap" that upset the airflow under these circumstances. Flutter due to the formation of shock waves on curved surfaces was another major problem, which led most famously to the breakup of a de Havilland Swallow and death of its pilot Geoffrey de Havilland, Jr. on 27 September 1946. A similar problem is thought to have been the cause of the 1943 crash of the BI-1 rocket aircraft in the Soviet Union.

All of these effects, although unrelated in most ways, led to the concept of a "barrier" making it difficult for an aircraft to exceed the speed of sound. Erroneous news reports caused most people to envision the sound barrier as a physical "wall," which supersonic aircraft needed to "break" with a sharp needle nose on the front of the fuselage. Rocketry and artillery experts' products routinely exceeded Mach 1, but aircraft designers and aerodynamicists during and after World War II discussed Mach 0.7 as a limit dangerous to exceed.

=== Early claims ===
During WWII and immediately thereafter, a number of claims were made that the sound barrier had been broken in a dive. The majority of these purported events can be dismissed as instrumentation errors. The typical airspeed indicator (ASI) uses air pressure differences between two or more points on the aircraft, typically near the nose and at the side of the fuselage, to produce a speed figure. At high speed, the various compression effects that lead to the sound barrier also cause the ASI to go non-linear and produce inaccurately high or low readings, depending on the specifics of the installation. This effect became known as "Mach jump". Before the introduction of Mach meters, accurate measurements of supersonic speeds could only be made remotely, normally using ground-based instruments. Many claims of supersonic speeds were found to be far below this speed when measured in this fashion.

In 1942, Republic Aviation issued a press release stating that Lts. Harold E. Comstock and Roger Dyar had exceeded the speed of sound during test dives in a Republic P-47 Thunderbolt. It is widely agreed that this was due to inaccurate ASI readings. In similar tests, the North American P-51 Mustang demonstrated limits at Mach 0.85, with every flight over Mach 0.84 causing the aircraft to be damaged by vibration.

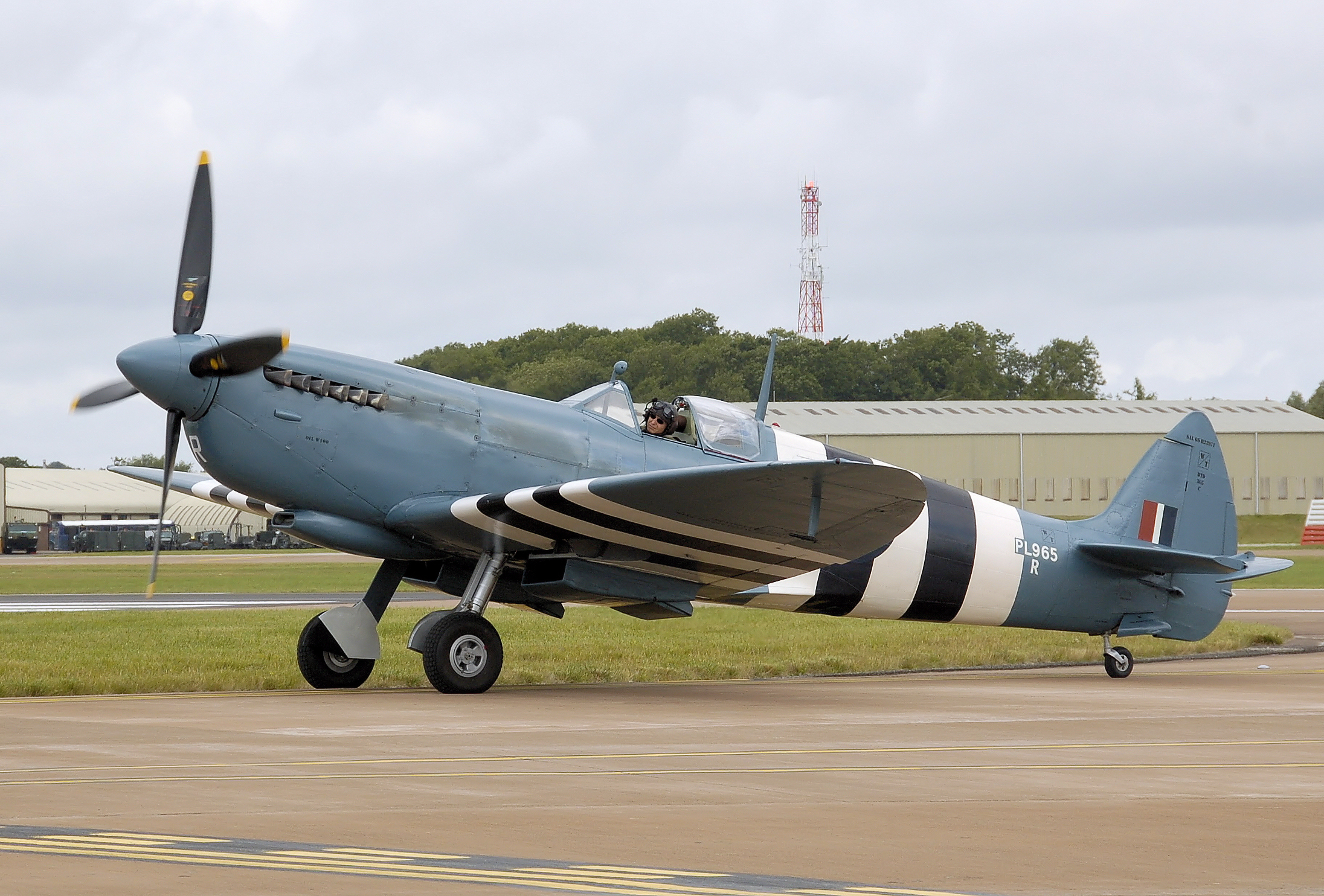
A Spitfire PR Mk XI (PL965) of the type used in the 1944 RAE Farnborough dive tests during which a highest Mach number of 0.92 was obtained

One of the highest recorded instrumented Mach numbers attained for a propeller aircraft is the Mach 0.891 for a Spitfire PR XI, flown during dive tests at the Royal Aircraft Establishment, Farnborough in April 1944. The Spitfire, a photo-reconnaissance variant, the Mark XI, fitted with an extended "rake type" multiple pitot system, was flown by Squadron Leader J. R. Tobin to this speed, corresponding to a corrected true airspeed (TAS) of 606 mph. In a subsequent flight, Squadron Leader Anthony Martindale achieved Mach 0.92, but it ended in a forced landing after over-revving damaged the engine.

Hans Guido Mutke claimed to have broken the sound barrier on 9 April 1945 in the Messerschmitt Me 262 jet aircraft. He states that his ASI pegged itself at 1,100 kilometres per hour (680 mph). Mutke reported not just transonic buffeting, but the resumption of normal control once a certain speed was exceeded, then a resumption of severe buffeting once the Me 262 slowed again. He also reported engine flame-out.

This claim is widely disputed, even by pilots in his unit. All of the effects he reported are known to occur on the Me 262 at much lower speeds, and the ASI reading is simply not reliable in the transonic. Further, a series of tests made by Karl Doetsch at the behest of Willy Messerschmitt found that the plane became uncontrollable above Mach 0.86, and at Mach 0.9 would nose over into a dive that could not be recovered from. Post-war tests by the RAF confirmed these results, with the slight modification that the maximum speed using new instruments was found to be Mach 0.84, rather than Mach 0.86.

In 1999, Mutke enlisted the help of Professor Otto Wagner of the Munich Technical University to run computational tests to determine whether the aircraft could break the sound barrier. These tests do not rule out the possibility, but are lacking accurate data on the coefficient of drag that would be needed to make accurate simulations. Wagner stated: "I don't want to exclude the possibility, but I can imagine he may also have been just below the speed of sound and felt the buffeting, but did not go above Mach-1."

One bit of evidence presented by Mutke is on page 13 of the "Me 262 A-1 Pilot's Handbook" issued by Headquarters Air Materiel Command, Wright Field, Dayton, Ohio as Report No. F-SU-1111-ND on January 10, 1946:

Speeds of 950 km/h (590 mph) are reported to have been attained in a shallow dive 20° to 30° from the horizontal. No vertical dives were made. At speeds of 950 to 1,000 km/h (590 to 620 mph) the air flow around the aircraft reaches the speed of sound, and it is reported that the control surfaces no longer affect the direction of flight. The results vary with different airplanes: some wing over and dive while others dive gradually. It is also reported that once the speed of sound is exceeded, this condition disappears and normal control is restored.

The comments about restoration of flight control and cessation of buffeting above Mach 1 are very significant in a 1946 document. However, it is not clear where these terms came from, as it does not appear the US pilots carried out such tests.

In his 1990 book Me-163, former Messerschmitt Me 163 "Komet" pilot Mano Ziegler claims that his friend, test pilot Heini Dittmar, broke the sound barrier while diving the rocket plane, and that several people on the ground heard the sonic booms. He claims that on 6 July 1944, Dittmar, flying Me 163B V18, bearing the Stammkennzeichen alphabetic code VA+SP, was measured traveling at a speed of 1,130 km/h (702 mph). However, no evidence of such a flight exists in any of the materials from that period, which were captured by Allied forces and extensively studied. Dittmar had been officially recorded at 1,004.5 km/h (623.8 mph) in level flight on 2 October 1941 in the prototype Me 163A V4. He reached this speed at less than full throttle, as he was concerned by the transonic buffeting. Dittmar himself does not make a claim that he broke the sound barrier on that flight and notes that the speed was recorded only on the AIS. He does, however, take credit for being the first pilot to "knock on the sound barrier".

There are a number of uncrewed vehicles that flew at supersonic speeds during this period. In 1933, Soviet designers working on ramjet concepts fired phosphorus-powered engines out of artillery guns to get them to operational speeds. It is possible that this produced supersonic performance as high as Mach 2, but this was not due solely to the engine itself. In contrast, the German V-2 ballistic missile routinely broke the sound barrier in flight, for the first time on 3 October 1942. By September 1944, V-2s routinely achieved Mach 4 (1,200 m/s, or 3044 mph) during terminal descent.

=== Breaking the sound barrier ===
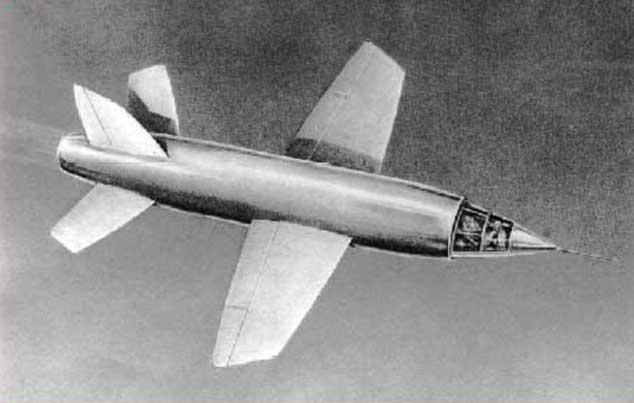
The prototype Miles M.52 turbojet powered aircraft, designed to achieve supersonic level flight

In 1942, the United Kingdom's Ministry of Aviation began a top-secret project with Miles Aircraft to develop the world's first aircraft capable of breaking the sound barrier. The project resulted in the development of the prototype Miles M.52 turbojet-powered aircraft, which was designed to reach 1,000 mph (417 m/s; 1,600 km/h) (over twice the existing speed record) in level flight, and to climb to an altitude of 36,000 ft (11 km) in 1 minute 30 seconds.

A number of advanced features were incorporated into the resulting M.52 design, which resulted from consulting experts in government establishments with a current knowledge of supersonic aerodynamics. In particular, the design featured a conical nose, for low supersonic drag, and sharp wing leading edges. The design used very thin wings of biconvex section proposed by Jakob Ackeret for low drag. The wing tips were "clipped" to keep them clear of the conical shock wave generated by the nose of the aircraft. The fuselage had a 5-foot diameter with an annular fuel tank around the engine.

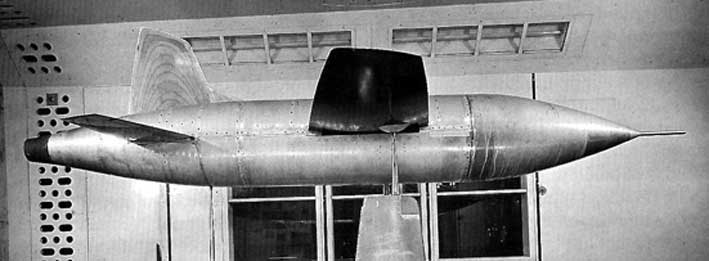
One of the Vickers models undergoing supersonic wind-tunnel testing at the Royal Aircraft Establishment (RAE) around 1946

Another critical addition was the use of a power-operated stabilator, also known as the all-moving tail, flying tail, or all-flying tail, a key to transonic and supersonic flight control, which contrasted with traditional hinged tailplanes (horizontal stabilizers) connected mechanically to the pilots control column. Conventional control surfaces became ineffective at the high subsonic speeds then being achieved by fighters in dives, due to the aerodynamic forces caused by the formation of shockwaves at the hinge and the rearward movement of the centre of pressure, which together could override the control forces that could be applied mechanically by the pilot, hindering recovery from the dive. A major impediment to early transonic flight was control reversal, the phenomenon which caused flight inputs (stick, rudder) to switch direction at high speed; it was the cause of many accidents and near-accidents. A stabilator is required for an aircraft to pass through the transonic speed range safely, without losing pilot control. The Miles M.52 was the first instance of this solution, which has since been universally applied.

Initially, the aircraft was to use Frank Whittle's latest engine, the Power Jets W.2/700, with which it would only reach supersonic speed in a shallow dive. To develop a fully supersonic version of the aircraft, extra thrust would be provided with the addition of the No.4 augmentor which gave extra airflow from a ducted fan and reheat behind the fan.

Although the project was eventually cancelled, the research was used to construct an uncrewed 30% scale model of the M.52 that went on to achieve a speed of Mach 1.38 in a successful, controlled transonic and supersonic level test flight in October 1948; this was a unique achievement at that time which provided "some validation of the aerodynamics of the M.52 upon which the model was based".

Meanwhile, test pilots achieved high speeds in the tailless, swept-wing de Havilland DH 108. One of them was Geoffrey de Havilland, Jr., who was killed on 27 September 1946 when his DH 108 broke up at about Mach 0.9. John Derry has been called "Britain's first supersonic pilot" because of a dive he made in a DH 108 on 6 September 1948.

=== The first aircraft to officially break the sound barrier ===
The British Air Ministry signed an agreement with the United States to exchange all its high-speed research data and designs, including that for the M.52, with equivalent US research but the U.S. reneged on the agreement, and nothing was forthcoming in return.

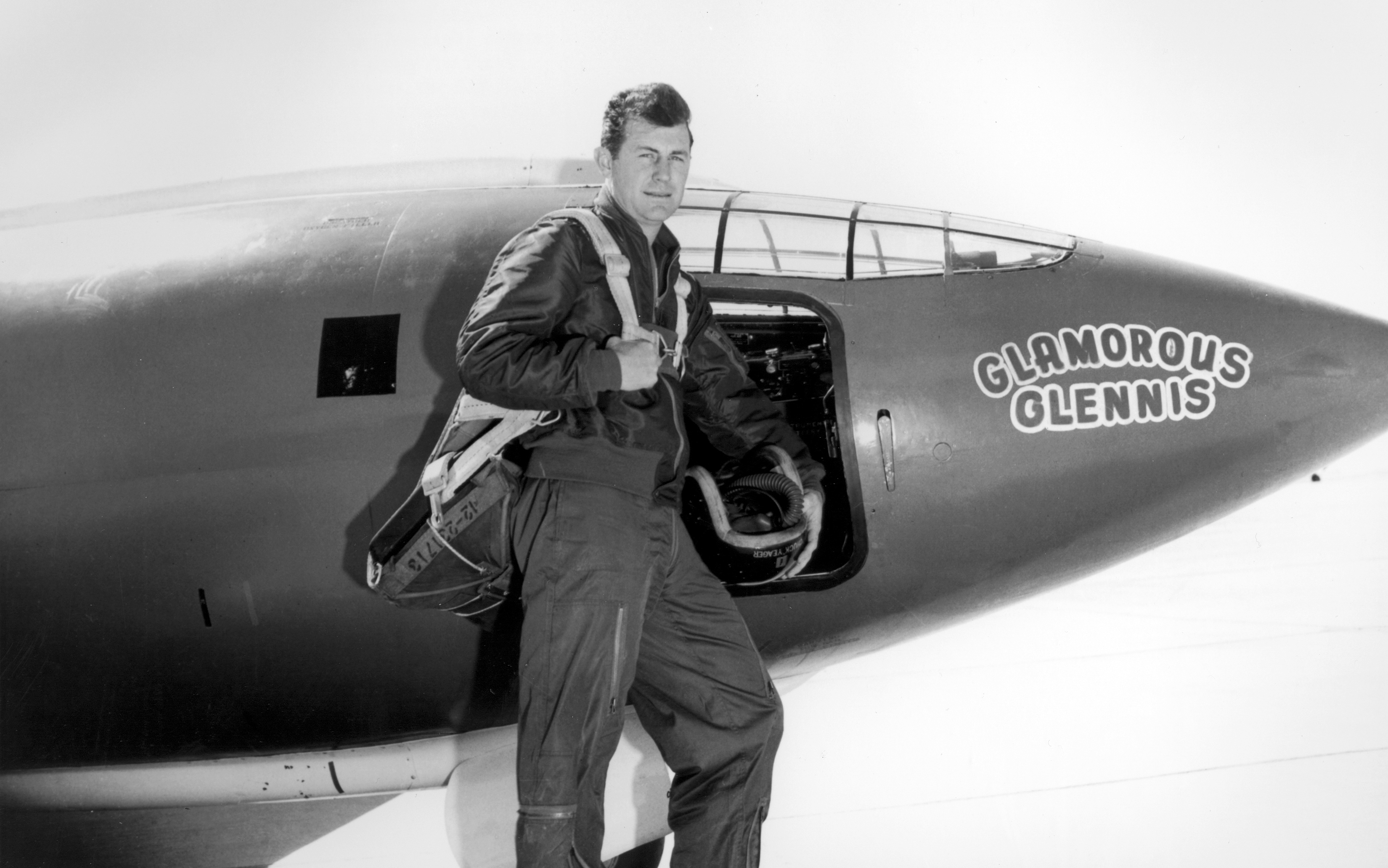
Chuck Yeager in front of the Bell X-1, the first aircraft to break the sound barrier in level flight

The Bell X-1, the first US crewed aircraft built to break the sound barrier, was visually similar to the Miles M.52 but with a high-mounted horizontal tail to keep it clear of the wing wake. Compared to the all-moving tail on the M.52 the X-1 used a conventional tail with elevators but with a movable stabilizer to maintain control passing through the sound barrier. It was in the X-1 that Chuck Yeager became the first person to do so in level flight on 14 October 1947, flying at an altitude of 45,000 ft (13.7 km). George Welch made a plausible but officially unverified claim to have broken the sound barrier on 1 October 1947, while flying a North American XP-86 (later known as the F-86 Sabre). Welch also claimed to have repeated his supersonic flight on 14 October 1947, 30 minutes before Yeager broke the sound barrier in the Bell X-1. Although evidence from witnesses and instruments strongly imply that Welch achieved supersonic speed, the flights were not properly monitored and are not officially recognized. The XP-86 officially achieved supersonic speed on 26 April 1948.

On 14 October 1947, just under a month after the United States Air Force had been created as a separate service, the tests culminated in the first crewed supersonic flight, piloted by Air Force Captain Charles "Chuck" Yeager in aircraft #46-062, which he had christened Glamorous Glennis. The rocket-powered aircraft was launched from the bomb bay of a specially modified B-29 and glided to a landing on a runway. XS-1 flight number 50 is the first one where the X-1 recorded supersonic flight, with a maximum speed of Mach 1.06 (361 m/s, 1,299 km/h, 807.2 mph). Yeager's achievement was kept secret until June 10, 1948, when the Air Force publicly announced that he had been the first to break the sound barrier, and that test pilots Herb Hoover and Howard Lilly had also made supersonic flights after Yeager.

As a result of the X-1's initial supersonic flight, the National Aeronautics Association voted its 1947 Collier Trophy to be shared by the three main participants in the program. Honored at the White House by President Harry S. Truman were Larry Bell for Bell Aircraft, Captain Yeager for piloting the flights, and John Stack for the NACA contributions.

Jackie Cochran was the first woman to break the sound barrier, which she did on 18 May 1953, piloting a plane borrowed from the Royal Canadian Air Force, with Yeager accompanying her.

On December 3, 1957, Margaret Chase Smith became the first woman in Congress to break the sound barrier, which she did as a passenger in an F-100 Super Sabre piloted by Air Force Major Clyde Good.

In the late 1950s, Allen Rowley, a British journalist, was able to fly in a Super Sabre at 1000 mph, one of the few non-American civilians to exceed the speed of sound and one of the few civilians anywhere to make such a trip.

On 21 August 1961, a Douglas DC-8-43 (registration N9604Z) unofficially exceeded Mach 1 in a controlled dive during a test flight at Edwards Air Force Base, as observed and reported by the flight crew; the crew were William Magruder (pilot), Paul Patten (co-pilot), Joseph Tomich (flight engineer), and Richard H. Edwards (flight test engineer). This was the first supersonic flight by a civilian airliner, achieved before the Concorde or the Tu-144 flew.

=== The sound barrier understood ===
Chuck Yeager broke the sound barrier on 14 October 1947 in the Bell X-1, as shown in this newsreel.

As the science of high-speed flight became more widely understood, a number of changes led to the eventual understanding that the "sound barrier" is easily penetrated, with the right conditions. Among these changes were the introduction of thin swept wings, the area rule, and engines of ever-increasing performance. By the 1950s, many combat aircraft could routinely break the sound barrier in level flight, although they often suffered from control problems when doing so, such as Mach tuck. Modern aircraft can transit the "barrier" without control problems.

By the late 1950s, the issue was so well understood that many companies started investing in the development of supersonic airliners, or SSTs, believing that to be the next "natural" step in airliner evolution. However, this has not yet happened. Although the Concorde and the Tupolev Tu-144 entered service in the 1970s, both were later retired without being replaced by similar designs. The last flight of a Concorde in service was in 2003. Despite a resurgence of interest in the 2010s, as of 2024 there are no commercial supersonic airliners in service.

Although Concorde and the Tu-144 were the first aircraft to carry commercial passengers at supersonic speeds, they were not the first or only commercial airliners to break the sound barrier. On 21 August 1961, a Douglas DC-8 broke the sound barrier at Mach 1.012, or 1,240 km/h (776.2 mph), while in a controlled dive through 41,088 feet (12,510 m). The purpose of the flight was to collect data on a new design of leading edge for the wing.

=== Breaking the sound barrier in a land vehicle ===
On 12 January 1948, a Northrop uncrewed rocket sled became the first land vehicle to break the sound barrier. At a military test facility at Muroc Air Force Base (now Edwards AFB), California, it reached a peak speed of 1,019 mph (1,640 km/h) before jumping the rails.

On 15 October 1997, in a vehicle designed and built by a team led by Richard Noble, Royal Air Force pilot Andy Green became the first person to break the sound barrier in a land vehicle in compliance with Fédération Internationale de l'Automobile rules. The vehicle, called the ThrustSSC ("Super Sonic Car"), captured the record 50 years and one day after Yeager's first supersonic flight.

=== Breaking the sound barrier as a human projectile ===
==== Felix Baumgartner ====
In October 2012 Felix Baumgartner, with a team of scientists and sponsor Red Bull, attempted the highest sky-dive on record. The project would see Baumgartner attempt to jump 120,000 ft (36,580 m) from a helium balloon and become the first parachutist to break the sound barrier. The launch was scheduled for 9 October 2012, but was aborted due to adverse weather; subsequently the capsule was launched instead on 14 October. Baumgartner's feat also marked the 65th anniversary of U.S. test pilot Chuck Yeager's successful attempt to break the sound barrier in an aircraft.

Baumgartner landed in eastern New Mexico after jumping from a world record 128,100 feet (39,045 m), or 24.26 miles, and broke the sound barrier as he traveled at speeds up to 833.9 mph (1342 km/h, or Mach 1.26). In the press conference after his jump, it was announced that he was in freefall for 4 minutes 18 seconds, the second longest freefall after the 1960 jump of Joseph Kittinger for 4 minutes 36 seconds.

==== Alan Eustace ====
In October 2014, Alan Eustace, a senior vice president at Google, broke Baumgartner's record for highest sky-dive and also broke the sound barrier in the process. However, because Eustace's jump involved a drogue parachute, while Baumgartner's did not, their vertical speed and free-fall distance records remain in different categories.

== Legacy ==
- David Lean directed The Sound Barrier, a fictionalized retelling of the de Havilland DH 108 test flights.
- The Right Stuff, a 1983 film chronicling in part Chuck Yeager's famous 1947 record-breaking flight.

== See also ==
- Sonic boom
- Vapor cone
