= Little Fenton =

Village and civil parish in North Yorkshire, England

Coordinates: 53.809993°N 1.2102625°W

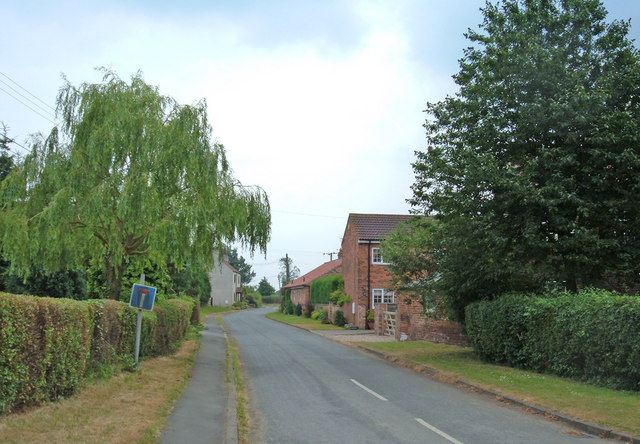

- Location within North Yorkshire
- Area: 3.16 km^{2} (1.22 sq mi)
- Population: 87 (2001 census)
  - Density: 28/km^{2} (73/sq mi)
- Civil parish: Little Fenton
- Unitary authority: North Yorkshire
- Ceremonial county: North Yorkshire
- Region: Yorkshire and the Humber
- Country: England
- Sovereign state: United Kingdom
- Police: North Yorkshire
- Fire: North Yorkshire
- Ambulance: Yorkshire
- Website: https://www.parishcouncilsnearme.co.uk/listing/little-fenton-parish-council/

Little Fenton is a settlement and civil parish about 11 miles from York, in the county of North Yorkshire, England. In 2001 the parish had a population of 87. The parish touches Biggin, Church Fenton and Sherburn in Elmet.

From 1974 to 2023 it was part of the Selby District, it is now administered by the unitary North Yorkshire Council.

== History ==
The name "Fenton" means 'Fen farm/settlement', the "Little" part to distinguish from Church Fenton. Church and Little Fenton were recorded in the Domesday Book as Fentun. Little Fenton was a township in the parish of Kirk Fenton (Church Fenton), it became a separate parish in 1866.
