= RAF Church Fenton =

Royal Air Force base in Yorkshire, England

RAF Church Fenton
- Church Fenton, North Yorkshire in England
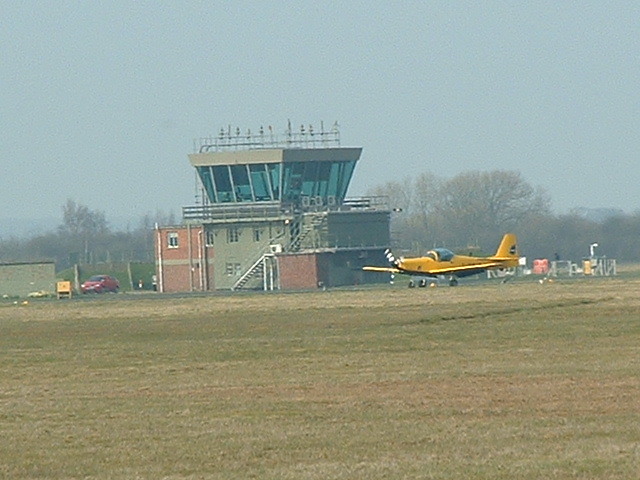
- The RAF Church Fenton control tower during 2001.

Site information
- Type: Sector Station (1939–59)
- Code: CF
- Owner: Ministry of Defence (MoD)
- Operator: Royal Air Force
- Controlled by: RAF Fighter Command (1937–59) * No. 11 Group RAF * No. 12 Group RAF * No. 13 Group RAF * No. 81 (OTU) Group RAF; RAF Flying Training Command (1959–)
- Condition: Closed

Location
- Location in North Yorkshire
- Coordinates: 53°50′04″N 001°11′44″W
- Grid reference: SE530380
- Area: 199 hectares

Site history
- Built: 1936/37
- In use: June 1937 – 2013
- Fate: Sold by the MOD and became Leeds East Airport.
- Battles/wars: European theatre of World War II; Cold War

Airfield information
- Identifiers: ICAO: EGXG, WMO: 03355
- Elevation: 9 metres (30 ft) AMSL
Runways
Direction	Length and surface
06/24	1,827 metres (5,994 ft) Asphalt
16/34	1,668 metres (5,472 ft) Asphalt

Royal Air Force Church Fenton or more simply RAF Church Fenton (ICAO: EGCM) is a former Royal Air Force station located 4.3 miles (6.9 km) south-east of Tadcaster, North Yorkshire, England and 6.3 miles (10.1 km) north-west of Selby, North Yorkshire, near the village of Church Fenton.

The station was opened in April 1937 and during the Second World War was home to air defence fighters, a role retained by the Station until the 1960s when it became a training station.

The last Station Commander of a self-determining RAF Church Fenton was Sqn Ldr David Morris, who had trained on Chipmunk aircraft at RAF Church Fenton in 1973. Sqn Ldr Morris returned to RAF Church Fenton in 1991 as the Officer Commanding Station Services Squadron, to prepare the as then autonomous station for yet another closure, and transfer into the control of RAF Linton-on-Ouse as a satellite airfield and Enhanced Relief Landing Ground.

The gates of the fully independent RAF Church Fenton were closed at 12:00 on 31 December 1992, However, with its assets such as the officers' mess subsequently razed to the ground to save on maintenance, and the married quarters and other buildings sold off piecemeal by the Ministry of Defence (MoD), RAF Church Fenton's runways and aviation infrastructure were alienated from the remainder of the administrative site and remained operational until 2013. The satellite airfield Enhanced Relief Landing Ground was sold in 2013 and is now a civilian airfield known as Leeds East Airport.

== History ==
=== Prewar ===
Plans for a new airfield adjacent to the village of Church Fenton were announced in June 1935, it was subject to protest from the local population particularly concerning the waste of valuable farming land and was close to an existing airfield 2 mi (3.2 km) away at Sherburn. Despite the protests construction started in early 1936 on the 260 acres (1.1 km^{2}) site, a mixture of private and West Riding County Council-owned farm land.

On 1 April 1937 the station was declared open and on 19 April the first station commander Wing Commander W.E. Swann assumed command. Within two months No. 71 Squadron RAF had arrived with the Gloster Gladiator.

=== Second World War ===
Opened in 1937, it saw the peak of its activity during the years of the Second World War, when it served within the defence network of fighter bases of the RAF providing protection for the Leeds, Bradford, Sheffield and Humber estuary industrial regions.

During September 1940 it became home to the first RAF "Eagle squadron" of American volunteers being No. 71 Squadron RAF initially with the Brewster Buffalo I for one month before changing to the Hawker Hurricane I. The airfield was also home to both the first all-Canadian and all-Polish squadrons, with No. 242 Squadron RAF for the Canadians and No. 306 Polish Fighter Squadron for the Polish. 242 Squadron, first established in the First World War and then disbanded, was re-formed here in October 1939, using Canadian personnel.

As technologies evolved, No. 54 Operational Training Unit (54 OTU) was formed at Church Fenton in 1940, the first night fighter OTU, staying until 1942. Some of the squadrons stationed there also flew the de Havilland Mosquito.

The following squadrons were billeted at Church Fenton at various times:

- No. 25 Squadron
- No. 26 (South African) Squadron
- No. 46 Squadron
- No. 64 Squadron
- No. 68 Squadron
- No. 71 (Eagle) Squadron
- No. 72 Squadron
- No. 73 Squadron
- No. 85 Squadron
- No. 87 (United Provinces) Squadron
- No. 96 Squadron
- No. 124 (Baroda) Squadron
- No. 125 (Newfoundland) Squadron
- No. 183 (Gold Coast) Squadron
- No. 234 (Madras Presidency) Squadron
- No. 242 Squadron
- No. 245 (Northern Rhodesian) Squadron
- No. 249 (Gold Coast) Squadron
- No. 264 (Madras Presidency) Squadron
- No. 288 Squadron
- No. 307 Polish Night Fighter Squadron
- No. 308 Polish Fighter Squadron
- No. 409 Squadron RCAF
- No. 456 Squadron RAAF
- No. 488 Squadron RNZAF
- No. 600 (City of London) Squadron AAF
- No. 604 (County of Middlesex) Squadron AAF

=== Postwar ===
After the war it at first retained its role as a fighter base, being among the first to receive modern jet aircraft, namely the Gloster Meteor and the Hawker Hunter. Between October 1950 and March 1957 it was the base of No. 609 Squadron RAF, within the Royal Auxiliary Air Force and named "West Riding". The unit was equipped with Gloster Meteors.

In later years, its role was mainly flight training. No. 7 Flying Training School RAF was based here between 1962 and 1966 and again between 1979 and 1992, equipped with Hunting Aircraft Jet Provost T3 trainers.

For some years it was home to the Royal Navy Elementary Flying Training School (RNEFTS) using the Scottish Aviation Bulldog, and again 1979–1992, triggered by the introduction of the Panavia Tornado, being the first station to receive the new turboprop-powered Short Tucano T.1 basic fast jet trainers. From 1998 to 2003 Church Fenton was the RAF's main Elementary Flying Training airfield.

The following squadrons were also posted here at some point:

- 19, 23, 41, 72, 85.
- 112, 129 (Mysore), 141.
- 257 (Burma), 263 (Fellowship of the Bellows) with Meteors, 264 (Madras Presidency).

=== 2003–2013 ===
On 25 March 2013 it was announced that Church Fenton runways would close by the end of 2013. The units would be relocated to RAF Linton-on-Ouse by 31 December 2013.

By 19 December 2013, all units had relocated and the airfield was closed. Some equipment will be relocated to RAF Topcliffe. MoD security continued to secure the site until disposal. A NOTAM was issued suspending the air traffic zone (ATZ) at the end of 2013.

The following units were here at some point:

- Relief Landing Ground for No. 1 Flying Training School RAF (January 1966 – ? & October 1969 – ? & April 1992 – ?)
- No. 2 Flying Training School RAF (January 1970 – December 1974)
- No. 3 Mobile Glider Servicing Party
- No. 4 Radio Maintenance Unit (July – August 1940)
- Aircraft of No. 4 Radio Servicing Section (September 1940 – February 1941)
- No. 6 Anti-Aircraft Co-operation Unit RAF
- Detachment of No. 7 Anti-Aircraft Co-operation Unit RAF (November 1940)
- No. 9 Air Experience Flight RAF (November 1959 – March 1962 & May 1966 – August 1975)
- No. 13 Fighter Command Servicing Unit
- No. 21 (Base Defence) Wing RAF (January – April 1944)
- No. 21 (Air Defence Missile) Wing RAF (1960 – February 1963) became No. 21 (SAM) Servicing Wing RAF (February – August 1963)
- No. 22 Gliding School RAF (February 1948 – May 1950)
- No. 23 Group RAF (September 1959 – March 1962)
- No. 23 Group Communication Flight RAF (September 1959 – February 1962)
- No. 60 Maintenance Unit RAF (July 1959 – March 1962)
- No. 73 (Signals) Wing Calibration Flight RAF (November 1942)
- No. 141 Airfield Headquarters RAF (January – May 1944)
- No. 148 (SAM) Servicing Wing RAF (February 1963 – May 1964)
- No. 2794 Squadron RAF Regiment
- Aircrew Officers Training School RAF (January 1968 – May 1969)
- Central Flying School Primary Flying Squadron RAF (January 1967 – January 1970)
- Relief Landing Ground for Joint Elementary Flying Training School RAF (1995 – ?)
- Leeds University Air Squadron (1946 – April 1947 & May 1948 – March 1954 & November 1959 – February 1962 & May 1966 – March 1969)
- Northern Sector HQ RAF (1956 – November 1957)
- Refresher Flying Flight RAF (April 1984 – 1991)
- Yorkshire Sector HQ RAF (November 1945 – July 1947)

== Air Displays ==
For a large part of its history RAF Church Fenton has hosted an annual air display, originally called "Empire Air Day" and later it became the annual “Battle of Britain” display. When the air display in aid of Soldier's Sailor's and Airmen's Families Association (SSAFA) discontinued at Leeds Bradford Airport it moved to RAF Church Fenton where it attracted large crowds, the largest being 63,000 in 1968. Allen Rowley, aviation correspondent at the Yorkshire Evening Post, was its principal organiser and commentator until 1989.

== Yorkshire Universities Air Squadron and ATC ==
The station was home to Yorkshire Universities Air Squadron and it is from there that they used to conduct their flying training in the Grob Tutor aircraft. Much of the station is now derelict and fenced off and the officers mess has been demolished. The airside section of the station is closed with various hangars incorporating YUAS's aircraft, engineering support, fire/ambulance facilities and a sports hangar. The station used to have a fully functioning and staffed air traffic control tower.

The unit was formed here during 1969 and returned during October 1995 when RAF Finningley was closing down.

The Station headquarters remains and used to incorporate YUAS's administration, presentation and social facilities. There was a canteen facility known as the "Feeder" and a basic accommodation block. Yorkshire UAS ceased operations at RAF Church Fenton on 19 December 2013, following the closure of the airfield.

== Current use ==
The airfield is now known as Leeds East Airport and is also home to 2434 (Church Fenton) Squadron Air Training Corps. The site was sold on 23 December 2014 to Makins Yorkshire Strawberries with the exception of a section containing the Air Cadets. In February 2015, Makins Enterprises (the new airfield owners) launched their new website, renaming the airfield. It will now be known as 'Leeds East Airport', with the slogan "Yorkshire's newest aviation destination." It is believed that Makins Enterprises will target the business jet market, while also running a flying school and other ventures. The second series of the ITV drama Victoria was shot at a hangar onsite in 2017.

=== Current operational units ===
- 2434 (Church Fenton) Squadron Air Training Corps

== See also ==
- List of former Royal Air Force stations
