= No. 21 Wing RAF =

No. 21 Wing RAF 21st (Training) Wing RFC No. 2163 Wing Servicing Unit RAF No. 21 Base Defence Wing RAF No. 21 (Base Defence) Sector RAF No. 21 (Air Defence Missile) Wing RAF No. 21 (Surface to Air Missile) Wing RAF No. 21 (SAM) Servicing Wing RAF
- Active: 1916-19; 1940; 1944; 1960-61; 1961-63; 1963
- Country: United Kingdom
- Branch: Royal Flying Corps; Royal Air Force
- Type: Wing

No. 21 Wing RAF is a former Royal Air Force wing that was operational during the First and the Second World Wars along with the Cold War.

== First World War ==
21st (Training) Wing RFC was formed on 9 August 1916 at Filton Aerodrome, it moved to Circenster Castle on 2 September 1916 and was transferred to Southern Group Command on 10 January 1917. The wing was then transferred to Southern Training Brigade on 5 September 1917 and to Western Group Command on 8 November 1917. It was disbanded on 18 February 1919.

It controlled various bases such as: Beaulieu, Bicester, Filton, Ford Junction, Lilbourne, Port Meadow, Rendcombe, Weston-on-the-Green, Witney & Yatesbury.

== Second World War ==
No. 2163 Wing Servicing Unit RAF was disbanded at RAF Cosford on 24 June 1940.

No. 21 Base Defence Wing RAF was formed on 1 January 1944 at RAF Church Fenton within No. 85 Group RAF controlling No. 141 Airfield Headquarters RAF. The wing moved to Sopley Park on 26 April 1944 and became No. 21 (Base Defence) Sector on 12 May 1944. The sector controlled No. 141 Wing RAF and moved to St Laurent on 6 June 1944, then to Longeville, Chateau Tocqueville, Utah Beach, Southampton and finally RAF Ibsley on 28 July 1944 where it was disbanded on 10 November 1944.

== Cold War ==
The wing was reformed on 1 May 1960 as No. 21 (Air Defence Missile) Wing RAF at RAF Lindholme within No. 11 Group RAF looking after PGM-17 Thor squadrons:

- No. 118 Squadron RAF
- No. 94 Squadron RAF
- No. 247 (China-British) Squadron RAF

The wing became No. 21 (Surface to Air Missile) Wing RAF on 1 June 1961 with 94, 112 and 247 Squadrons. It was renamed again to No. 21 (SAM) Servicing Wing RAF on 1 February 1963 while at RAF Church Fenton and disbanded shortly afterwards on 31 August 1963.

== See also ==
- List of wings of the Royal Air Force
