= Church Fenton =

Village and civil parish in North Yorkshire, England

Coordinates: 53°49′34″N 1°13′18″W

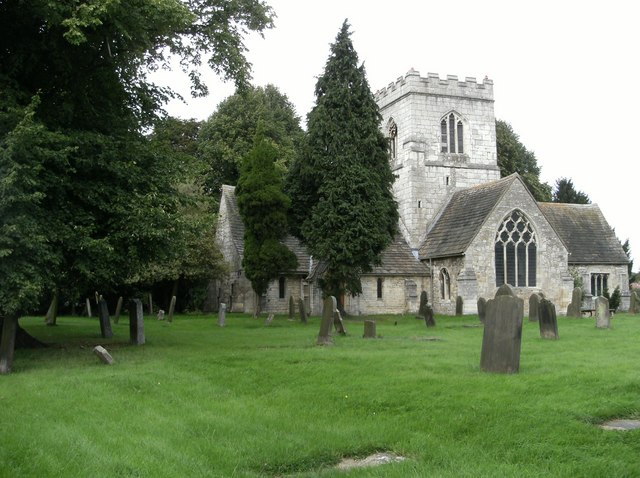
- Church of St Mary the Virgin, Church Fenton

- Location within North Yorkshire
- Population: 1,531 (2021 census)
- OS grid reference: SE513368
  - London: 150 mi (240 km) SSE
- Civil parish: Church Fenton
- Unitary authority: North Yorkshire
- Ceremonial county: North Yorkshire
- Region: Yorkshire and the Humber
- Country: England
- Sovereign state: United Kingdom
- Post town: TADCASTER
- Postcode district: LS24
- Dialling code: 01937
- Police: North Yorkshire
- Fire: North Yorkshire
- Ambulance: Yorkshire
- UK Parliament: Wetherby and Easingwold

Church Fenton is a village and civil parish in the North Yorkshire district of North Yorkshire, England. It is about 16 miles (26 km) east of Leeds, about 6 miles (10 km) south-east from Tadcaster and 3 miles (5 km) north from Sherburn in Elmet. Neighbouring villages include Barkston Ash, Cawood and Ulleskelf. The former RAF Church Fenton is located immediately north-east, which is now known as Leeds East Airport.

== History ==
The name 'Church Fenton' means a village with a church in fen or marshland. The village was recorded along with nearby Little Fenton as Fentun in the Domesday Book of 1086, with no mention of a church. However in 1338 the establishment of church was signified by the name Kirk Fenton. The two names have been variously used to describe either the village or a parish including the hamlets of Little Fenton to the south and Biggin to the south-east. The area was agricultural with some quarry work until the arrival of the Leeds and Selby Railway in 1839, resulting in the development of local industry, including a brickworks and tileworks.

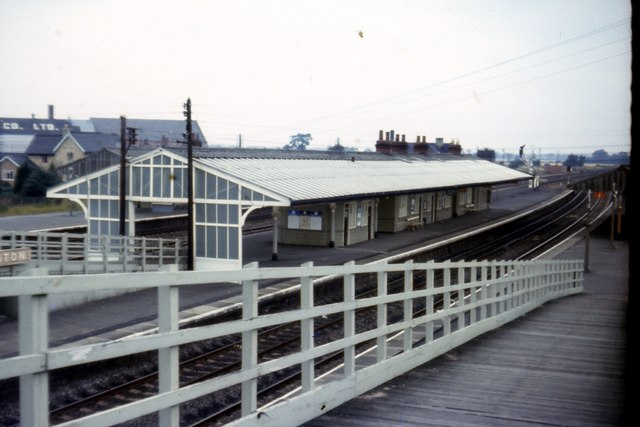
Church Fenton railway station in 1970

There was also a gas holder and tank works in the 1920s. Further lines to Harrogate, Leeds and York followed, so that at one point there were three stations. All but one were demolished in the 1990s. A row of terraced houses is called Chicory Row indicating the crop which was grown, boiled and bottled locally at one time.

In 1936 RAF Church Fenton was built as a fighter base and took part in the defence of northern cities and the east coast during the Second World War. Later it was used as a pilot training base.

It was historically in the West Riding of Yorkshire until 1974, but is now in the county of North Yorkshire. From 1974 to 2023 it was part of the Selby District, it is now administered by the unitary North Yorkshire Council.

== Amenities ==
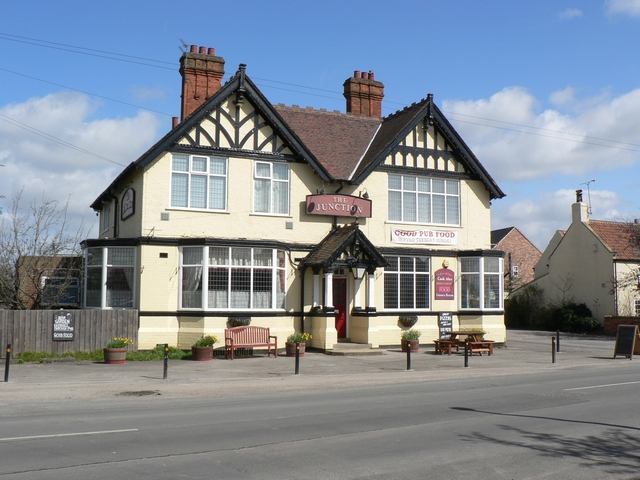
The Junction

The village has a community shop which is run by the residents of the village as volunteers and two public houses: The Fenton Flyer, and the newly reopened White Horse pub which was bought by the villagers through a share buy in scheme. Formerly there were three pubs. The former railway station booking office is now a licensed Indian restaurant, Sunar Bangla. The school, Kirk Fenton Parochial Church of England Primary School reflects the name of the local ecclesiastical parish. Village commuters are served by Church Fenton railway station. The village is also home to a Met Office Weather station.

The studio scenes for the 2016 television series Victoria were filmed in a converted aircraft hangar in Church Fenton.

== Buildings ==
St Mary the Virgin's Church, on Church Street, dates from the 13th century, with a 15th-century tower and is one of the smallest cruciform churches in England. It is a Grade I listed building. The Old Vicarage, on Main Street is also a listed building, Grade II, as is the Village Cross. The church was originally dedicated to St John the Baptist and one of the three bells (18th century) has the figure of St John. It is of Magnesian Limestone with slate roofing. The tower is square with battlements and as well as the bells contains a clock which was installed in 1780. It is fitted with aircraft warning lights because of the nearby aerodrome.

The Methodist church dates from 1892.

There is also an exclusive new development of 9 executive houses built near the station, Maple Drive, making the area a more upmarket residential commuter village.

== Climate ==
Climate data for Church Fenton, North Yorkshire 1991–2020
Month	Jan	Feb	Mar	Apr	May	Jun	Jul	Aug	Sep	Oct	Nov	Dec	Year
Mean daily maximum °C (°F)	7.3 (45.1)	8.1 (46.6)	10.5 (50.9)	13.3 (55.9)	16.4 (61.5)	19.1 (66.4)	21.5 (70.7)	21.0 (69.8)	18.3 (64.9)	14.2 (57.6)	10.2 (50.4)	7.5 (45.5)	14.0 (57.2)
Daily mean °C (°F)	4.3 (39.7)	4.7 (40.5)	6.5 (43.7)	8.7 (47.7)	11.7 (53.1)	14.5 (58.1)	16.7 (62.1)	16.4 (61.5)	14.0 (57.2)	10.6 (51.1)	6.9 (44.4)	4.4 (39.9)	10.0 (50.0)
Mean daily minimum °C (°F)	1.3 (34.3)	1.2 (34.2)	2.5 (36.5)	4.1 (39.4)	6.9 (44.4)	10.0 (50.0)	11.9 (53.4)	11.9 (53.4)	9.7 (49.5)	6.9 (44.4)	3.7 (38.7)	1.4 (34.5)	6.0 (42.8)
Average precipitation mm (inches)	48.7 (1.92)	42.2 (1.66)	41.0 (1.61)	43.2 (1.70)	43.1 (1.70)	55.2 (2.17)	52.2 (2.06)	62.3 (2.45)	56.4 (2.22)	58.4 (2.30)	58.7 (2.31)	58.2 (2.29)	619.6 (24.39)
Average precipitation days (≥ 1.0 mm)	10.9	9.1	9.0	8.5	8.7	9.0	9.1	10.0	8.6	10.4	11.5	11.2	115.9
Mean monthly sunshine hours	55.1	86.0	113.7	162.5	187.7	179.7	196.3	179.0	132.1	106.4	69.9	56.2	1,524.5
Source: Met Office

== See also ==
- Listed buildings in Church Fenton
