= Yorkshire Universities Air Squadron =

University flying squadron of the Royal Air Force

- Yorkshire UAS
- Squadron badge
- Active: 15 Mar 1969 – present
- Country: United Kingdom
- Branch: Royal Air Force
- Role: Officer Training, Ab-Initio Flying Training
- Part of: No. 6 Flying Training School
- Garrison/HQ: RAF Leeming
- Mottos: Latin: Universitate sublimis (All Raised on High)
- Equipment: Grob Tutor T1
- Website: Official website

Insignia
- Identification symbol: YUAS Badge:In front of a Rose Argent barbed and seeded slipped and leaved all proper an open Book Azure/Or/Argent

Yorkshire Universities Air Squadron (more commonly known as YUAS) is a Royal Air Force flying training unit that currently operates out of RAF Leeming in North Yorkshire, England. One of fifteen University Air Squadrons, the unit traditionally recruits students from universities across the Yorkshire and Humber region and provides bursaries for those who wish to pursue a career in the Royal Air Force.

== History ==
YUAS was formed in 1969 when the University Air Squadron (UAS) from Hull and the UAS from Leeds, were combined to make YUAS. Leeds UAS was formed in January 1941 and had been allocated to airfields at Sherburn-in-Elmet and RAF Yeadon. Whilst at Yeadon, the squadron represented the final RAF presence when the airfield had gone over to a commercial operation as (what is now) Leeds Bradford Airport. Hull UAS was formed at RAF Driffield, but flew out of Leconfield and Brough. With the amalgamation of the two squadrons in 1969, flying was retained at RAF Leconfield for students from Hull University. As a formed squadron, YUAS first flew from RAF Church Fenton between 1969 and 1975.

The Queen approved the badge for the squadron in 1972; the blazon depicts a Yorkshire white rose with an open book on top of it. The rose represents Yorkshire, and the book represents the universities of the county. In July 1976, two Bulldog aircraft from the squadron were damaged over Southport beach in north west England. One aircraft went into a spin from which the aircrew could not recover, and both pilot and instructor bailed out, with the instructor's parachute opening just before he hit the ground, which resulted in spinal damage. The student pilot was unhurt. Another aircraft landed on the beach to check on the bailed-out crew, and this second aircraft flipped over in the mud. All aircrew survived.

When Church Fenton was placed under a care and maintenance programme as a Relief Landing Ground (RLG) for RAF Linton-on-Ouse, the squadron moved to RAF Finningley in 1975. It returned to a resurgent Church Fenton in 1995 when RAF Finningley was closed.

YUAS is one of fifteen University Air Squadrons that are spread out across Great Britain, and it recruits from the universities at Bradford, Huddersfield, Hull, Leeds, Sheffield and York, with about 30 new intakes every year. Alongside the original universities that were listed for YUAS, students from Sheffield Hallam, Leeds College of Music, Leeds Metropolitan University and York St John University, can also apply to join YUAS. Students who join YUAS are enlisted as Officer Cadets in the Royal Air Force Volunteer Reserve and receive 30 hours of flying training annually.

In 1998, a contract was signed to replace the Bulldog trainer aircraft with the Grob G115 (Tutor). A private company, Vosper Thorneycroft, were contracted to supply maintenance on the aircraft through a private contract. The Tutor aircraft was delivered to the University Air Squadrons from July 1999 onwards.

In 2013, it was announced that RAF Church Fenton would be closing down and that all units would need to be transferred elsewhere. In the case of YUAS and No. 9 Air Experience Flight RAF, this would mean a transfer to RAF Linton-on-Ouse, some 7 miles (12 km) north-west of York. In 2014, a year after moving to Linton-on-Ouse, YUAS won the best University Air Squadron beating 13 other University Air Squadrons across Great Britain.

Due to the closure of RAF Linton-on-Ouse in 2021, YUAS relocated to RAF Leeming on 1 December 2020. An announcement was made on that day that YUAS would operate alongside Northumbrian Universities Air Squadron at RAF Leeming.

=== Locations ===
- March 1969 – August 1975: RAF Church Fenton
- August 1975 – October 1995: RAF Finningley
- October 1995 – August 2013: RAF Church Fenton
- August 2013 – December 2020: RAF Linton-on-Ouse
- December 2020 – present: RAF Leeming

== Incidents ==
- Wednesday July 22 1953, 'WD350' took from Sherburn-in-Elmet Airfield at 2.15pm, the student baled out, but the instructor was killed at Birkin, North Yorkshire. 33 year old Flt Lt Maurice Peter Davies (April 6 1914 - 1953), was an RAF pilot from 1939, and had taken part in the Battle of Britain and the Battle of Malta. He lived at Holland House, Church Hill, in Bramhope; his parents were from 'Summerhill' 106, Arthur Street, Kenilworth. His brother was Flying Officer J Davies DFM, who was lost in Shorts Stirling 'W7632' of 7 Sqn over Jussecourt-Minecourt in eastern France on 21 December 1942. 22 year old student Elwin John David Diabler attended Pontefract General Infirmary
- Friday 15 June 1956, WK641 cartwheeled at Alkborough, on the land of George Lee Stones, across a field of sugar beet. David Monkman, aged 19, born on August 9 1936, from 44 Cauldwell Villas in South Shields, who attended the South Shields High School, had a compound fracture of the right leg, with a badly cut face, being taken by ambulance to Scunthorpe Memorial Hospital. Dr J.R. Baker attended. A helicopter arrived from RAF North Coates, with Master Pilot D Green and Flt Sgt T Howley.l
- Friday April 12 1957, 'WK582' crashed with 20 year old David Ernest Young, who was killed, from Medlar Street in Camberwell

== Alumni ==
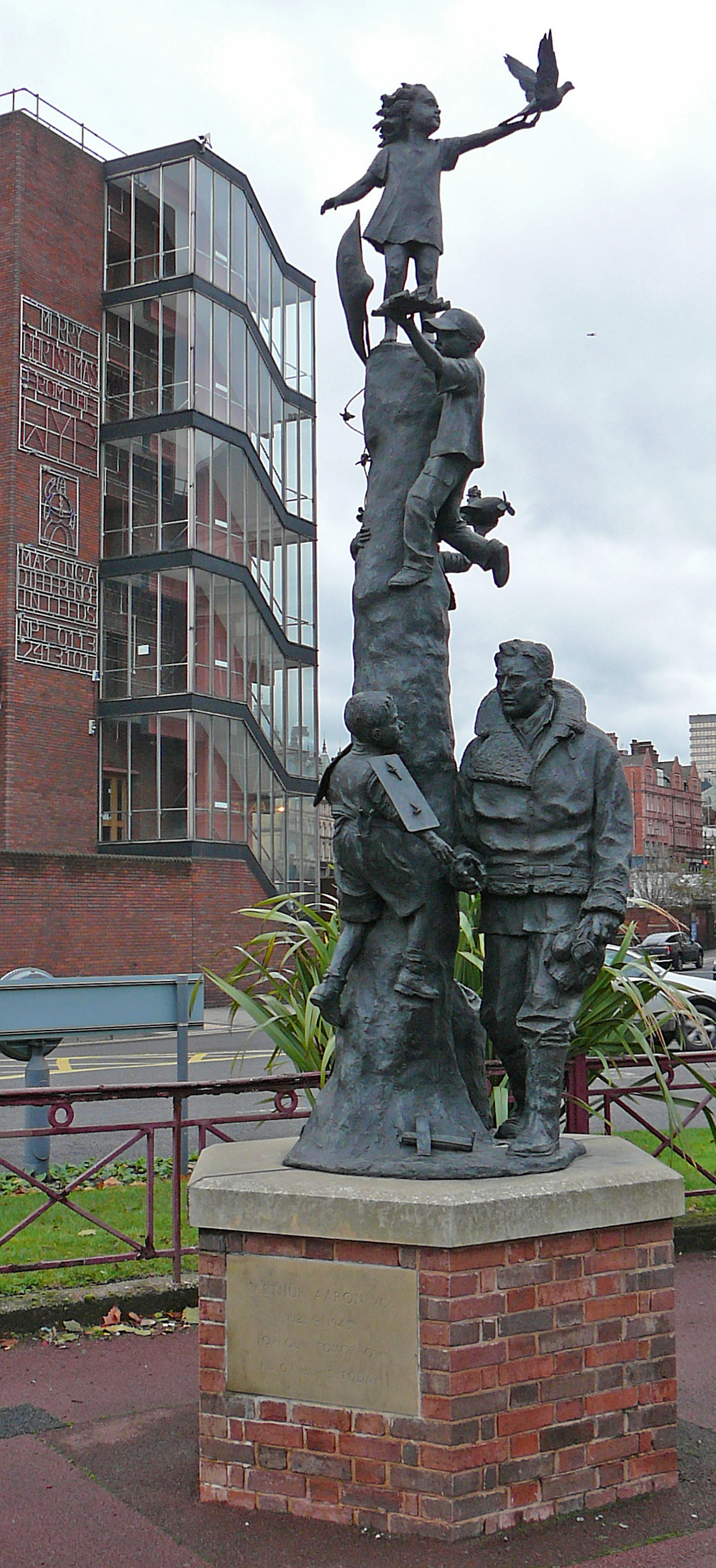
Arthur Louis Aaron memorial

- Arthur Louis Aaron VC
- Flying Officer Nebojsa Kujundzic, killed in March 1943 from RAF Elsham Wolds in 103 Sqn in Avro Lancaster 'W4333' at Yaxley, Cambridgeshire

== See also ==
- University Air Squadron units
- University Royal Naval Unit, the Royal Navy equivalent
- Officers Training Corps, the British Army equivalent
- List of Royal Air Force aircraft squadrons
