= Old Vicarage, Church Fenton =

Clergy house in Church Fenton, North Yorkshire, England

Coordinates: 53°49′34″N 1°13′04″W

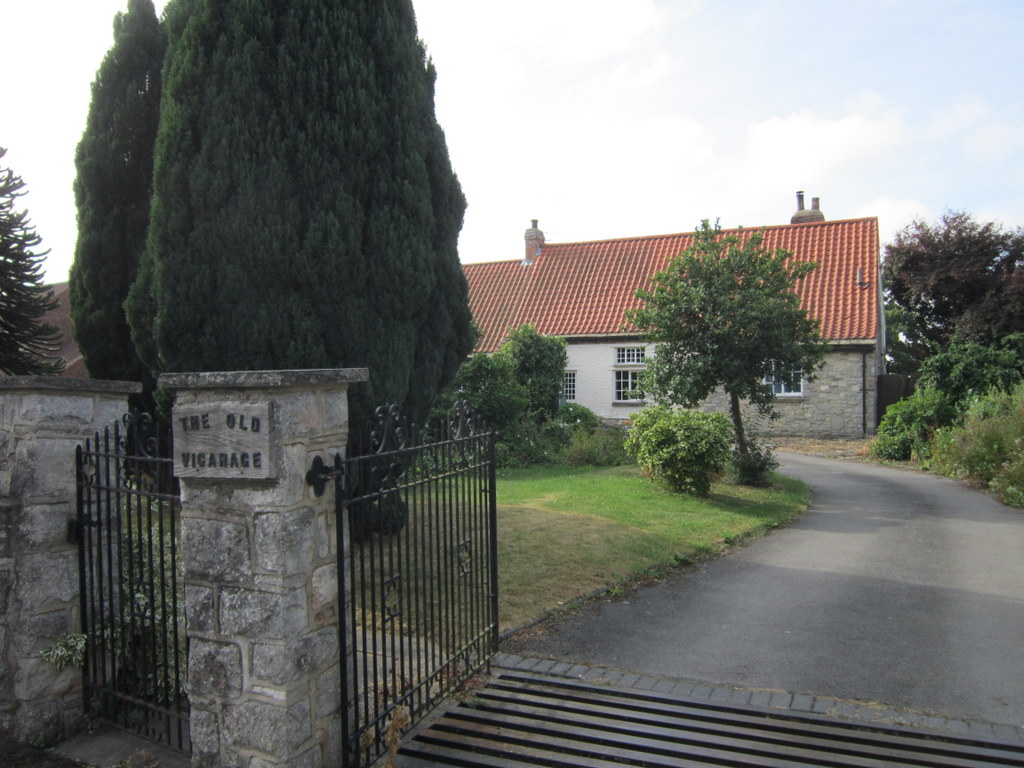
The house, in 2013

The Old Vicarage is a historic building in Church Fenton, a village in North Yorkshire, in England.

A vicarage was first endowed in Church Fenton in 1240. The current building probably originated as a 14th-century hall, but in the mid 16th century it was described as being in "ruynes and dikayes", and was partly rebuilt, a cross-wing at the west end replacing a former service wing and solar. From the mid 18th century, it was considered unsuitable for a vicar to inhabit, and so it was leased to other occupiers. A new vicarage was finally built in 1866, the old vicarage being sold and converted into three cottages. In 1923, it was converted back into a single house. It was grade II listed in 1967. In 1982, it was restored, with the dilapidated east end being entirely rebuilt, the west end extended to re-occupy its 16th century footprint, and the hall opened up to the roof.

The house has a timber framed core, encased in magnesian limestone and brick, partly rendered, and has a pantile roof with a lower row of stone slates. There is a single tall storey, and a T-shaped plan, with a main range of four bays, and a later rear range. The porch has a tiled roof, and the windows are a mix of casements and horizontally-sliding sashes. Inside, there is much exposed timber framing. The cross-wing has an upper storey, which includes a 16th-century brick fireplace.

== See also ==
- Listed buildings in Church Fenton
