= RAF Lindholme =

Royal Air Force base in Yorkshire, England

RAF Lindholme RAF Hatfield Woodhouse
- Hatfield Woodhouse, South Yorkshire in England
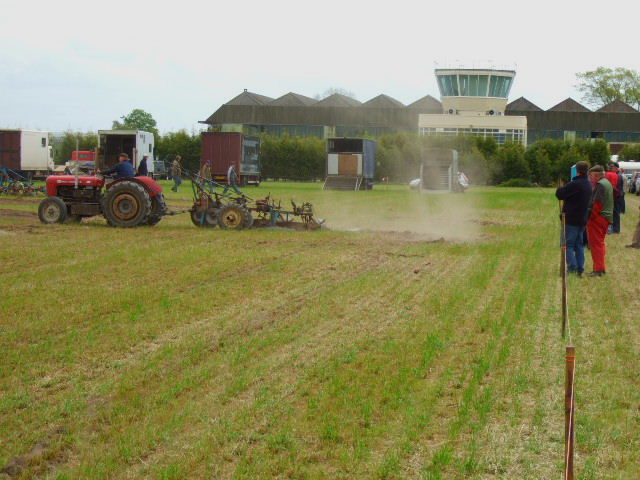
- Former control tower and field adjacent to the disused airfield

Site information
- Type: Royal Air Force station parent station 1940-43; 11 Base HQ 1943-44; 71 Base HQ 1944-46
- Code: LB
- Owner: Ministry of Defence
- Operator: Royal Air Force
- Controlled by: RAF Bomber Command * No. 1 Group RAF * No. 5 Group RAF * No. 7 (T) Group RAF

Location
- Shown within South Yorkshire RAF Lindholme (the United Kingdom)
- Coordinates: 53°33′06″N 000°58′03″W

Site history
- Built: 1938
- In use: 1 June 1940 – 1985
- Battles/wars: European theatre of World War II; Cold War

Airfield information
- Identifiers: ICAO: EGXQ
Runways
Direction	Length and surface
04/22	Concrete/Tarmac
14/32	Concrete/Tarmac

Royal Air Force Lindholme or more simply RAF Lindholme is a former Royal Air Force station in South Yorkshire, England. It was located 3.9 miles (6.3 km) south of Thorne and 6.9 miles (11.1 km) north east of Doncaster and was initially called RAF Hatfield Woodhouse.

== Early years ==
RAF Lindholme started life as an expansion scheme aerodrome built on the wide expanse of Hatfield moors, some 7 miles (11 km) east of Doncaster. The site, to the east of the A614 Thorne to Bawtry road, was a mile south of the small village of Hatfield Woodhouse, the name first selected for the new station, however, stores and correspondence was getting waylaid between the station and Hatfield Aerodrome in Hertfordshire, so in August 1940, the name was changed to Lindholme. Work began in the spring of 1938 taking in approximately 250 acres (1.0 km^{2}) of pasture for the airfield itself and a further 150 for the camp and support facilities.

Three Type-C hangars fronted the south-west side of the bombing circle, with a fourth and fifth behind the two outer hangars. The administration, technical and barrack area lay alongside the A614. As was common with these expansion scheme airfields, the construction of buildings took place over several months and the pace was only quickened by the outbreak of war. It officially opened in June 1940 under No. 5 Group, No. 50 Squadron RAF and its Hampdens arrived the following month.

No. 50 was the sole resident at Lindholme until June 1941, when a new Canadian-crewed bomber squadron No. 408 Squadron RCAF was raised there. The squadron was equipped with Hampdens and, once having found its feet, it was moved to Syerston to begin operations in July. The following month, Lindholme was one of a number of No.5 Group stations handed over to No.1 Group, as a result of which No.5 Group moved its No.50 Squadron to RAF Swinderby. From RAF Syerston, No.1 Group moved in two of the Polish squadrons under its charge – Nos. 304 and 305 – both flying Vickers Wellingtons. These two squadrons, having been operational since April, continued their contribution to Bomber Command's offensive from the new station throughout the following winter. In May 1942, No.304 Squadron was detached to assist RAF Coastal Command but the detachment soon became an assignment and did not return to RAF Bomber Command. Two months later No. 305 squadron was transferred to RAF Hemswell to concentrate Polish-crewed bomber squadrons on one station.

During the first two years of war, a bomb store had been constructed on the far side of the A614 as had a taxi spur with three pan hardstandings. A perimeter track and over 30 pan hardstandings had also been built during this period. By 1942 Lindholme was due for upgrading and the construction of concrete runways was put in hand. However, extension of the airfield was somewhat restricted by the Hatfield Moor Drain on the eastern boundary but more land was acquired to the north necessitating the closure of two roads, one to the hamlet of Lindholme. Because of these physical restrictions, only two runways were built, 14–32 and 04–22, both of which were extended to 1,400 yards (1,300 m) and 2,000 yards (1,800 m) respectively. A new bomb store was fashioned on land to the north of the station, which resulted in obstruction of seven pan dispersal points. Two others were lost due to the construction of a new perimeter track. Even so, the station ended up with 41 pans and one loop type. A few additional camp sites were added to the south of the main area giving the station maximum accommodation for 2,192 men and 365 women.

== Heavy Conversion Unit ==
Re-opened for flying in late October 1942, No.1656 Heavy Conversion Unit (HCU) moved in with a few Avro Lancasters and Avro Manchesters from RAF Breighton to serve No. 1 Group's conversion to the former type. Now an operational training base, over the next two years Lindholme was host to other units with an instructional mission. Both Lancaster and Handley Page Halifax crews were tutored here with No. 1667 HCU being established on the airfield in June 1943, moving out to RAF Faldingworth in October. In November the same year, No. 1 Lancaster Finishing School was activated using existing flights with a similar mission. On 3 November 1944, the station became No. 71 Base under the new training organisation – No. 7 Group RAF. Meanwhile, No. 1656 HCU remained at Lindholme until November 1945 when many Bomber Command units were disbanded. During the war, a total of 76 bombers were lost on operations flying from this airfield: 40 Hampdens, 35 Wellingtons and a single Lancaster.

== 1946 – 1980 ==
The immediate post-war years found Nos.57 and 100 Squadrons with their Lincolns in residence from May to September 1946. Wellingtons joined Lindholme with No. 5 Air Navigation School Wellington T.10s, Avro Ansons, and also 3 Vickers Valettas, coded A, B, and C.

In November 1952 things changed quite dramatically, when Bomber Command Bombing School (BCBS) arrived from RAF Scampton, using up to 18 Lincolns and 8 Varsities. In addition in 1958 there was an Anson C19 (serial VM387), and also the first Hastings arrived – TG503.

BCBS reduced in size quite dramatically in 1959 and 1960 and in the latter year there seemed to be only 4 Lincolns left, but this type was being replaced by Hastings. All the Lincolns had gone by 1961, with 8 Hastings, including the forerunner TG503, having replaced them.

In the late 1960s and early 1970s, 721 Mobile Radar Bomb Score Signals Unit (721 MRBSSU) was lodged on a dispersal on the eastern side of the airfield. 721's role was to track strike aircraft (mainly from the V-force) during simulated bombing runs at high and low-level and score the accuracy of the simulated attacks against designated targets within a radius of approximately 50 miles of Lindholme. Radar operators on the ground had to pick up and then 'lock on' to the aircraft whose track was then printed onto a chart in the operations caravan. Prior to the simulated weapon release the aircraft would transmit a steady tone on the radio which ceased at the release point. Following the simulated release the aircraft would then transmit a coded message that provided the MRBSSU with the information necessary (wind velocity etc.) to 'score' the attack, the results (in terms of bearing and distance from the designated target) being passed to the aircraft in another coded message. The unit was capable of handling aircraft at 10-minute intervals.

By 1968 the Bomber Command Bombing School had become Strike Command Bombing School and in 1972 moved out.

Hangars were used for storage by a USAF detachment during the height of the Cold War and later for various RAF ground units and Strike Command stores, where parts for front-line aircraft were stored.

Lindholme also had an interesting approach pattern with a visual circuit of 800 feet. This was so that the approach did not interfere with the approach for neighbouring RAF Finningley's runway 20.

During the late 1950s a site was built (later to become Northern Radar) to house the Type 82 radar and operational control building that controlled three air defence Bristol Bloodhound SAM 1 missile sites distributed within a 25-mile radius of the site. The site was part of the Fighter Command air defence network and was called a Tactical Control Centre (TCC). It became operational around 1961 and undertook these tasks for the duration of the SAM 1 missile life span before going over to area radar control functions. There were similar sites at RAF North Luffenham (Rutland) and RAF Watton (Norfolk).

== Northern Radar ==
RAF Lindholme was home to the 'Humber Radar' installation, later called 'Northern Radar' as part of the Linesman/Mediator system.

Northern Radar was a JATCRU (Joint Air Traffic Control Radar Unit) located at the RAF Lindholme site but housed discretely on the opposite side of the A614 road to the airfield. Northern Radar was one of a number of JATCRUs around the UK whose civil task were to provide area radar cover for the then three area Air Traffic Control Centres (ATCCs), Scottish (located at Redbrae House, Prestwick), Preston (Barton Hall), and London (at West Drayton). JATCRUs were created to provide this area radar cover as the ATCCs did not have radar facilities and were purely procedural control centres. The JATCRUs were located at RAF units using civil and military staff and radio communications, but military radar.

Other JATCRUs in the UK included Southern Radar at Sopley near Bournemouth, Western Radar at Aberporth in Wales, Ulster Radar at Bishops Court in Northern Ireland, Eastern Radar at Watton in East Anglia, Border Radar at Boulmer in the Northeast of England, Highland Radar at Buchan in the North of Scotland and Midland Radar at North Luffenham in Rutland. All of which came under the control of Military Air Traffic Operations (MATO).

Northern Radar's role was as an ATCRU providing radar services to civil and military aircraft in the lower, middle and upper airspace within its designated area of operations. The airspace above Flight Level 245 was known as a Mandatory Radar Service Area (MRSA) within which civil and military aircraft were placed under radar control. Beneath the MRSA all aircraft operating outside Controlled Airspace (CAS) were provided with a Radar Advisory Service.

The site had a Type 82 Radar installation (known as Orange Yeoman) but it also had remote links to other military radar heads.

== Latter years ==
From the mid 1960s to the early 1970s, Lindholme was used as a weekend gliding airfield by the Humber gliding club, a member of the Royal Air Force Gliding and Soaring Association. It was used extensively by the Sheffield Scouting movement as a base for gliding activities to attain Scout airman badges.

By 1980, Lindholme had been reduced to the status of a relief landing ground for RAF Finningley.

In 1974, RAF Lindholme became home to 643 Gliding School Air Training Corps, who moved in from RAF Hemswell on 1 April. They operated winch-launched Cadet Mk 3 and Sedbergh gliders, conducting air experience and glider pilot training for Air Cadets. 643 GS remained at Lindholme until the airfield closed in 1982, whereupon they moved to RAF Scampton.

By 1985, the whole camp was sold and turned into HM Prison Lindholme.

The last RAF connection, an automatic routing installation which opened on 25 May 1983 and was run by 840 Signals Unit, was closed in March 1996. It occupied the old Northern Radar building ground floor, refurbished to accommodate the Telegraphic Automatic Routing Equipment (TARE) and a manual telegraphic switching centre, and was parented by RAF Finningley. The TARE was a dual suite Ferranti Argus 500 computer system, each suite having a 64 k word core store and two 2 Mbyte hard drives and running software written using Coral 66.

Before installation at Lindholme this TARE, one of two, had been installed in transportable cabins, originally destined for RAF Gan (Maldives) or RAF Episkopi (Cyprus). Though hardstandings were constructed at the intended sites the cabins were never deployed, having been overtaken by defence cuts. The TAREs were stored and then removed from the cabins. The first was installed at RAF Boddington as No 9 Signals Unit, and the second eventually arrived at Lindholme. The opening of 840 Signals unit allowed the RAF to close the Signals unit at RAF Stanbridge and sell off a large part of that site. It also gave the Defence Communications Network much-needed diversity by providing a third TARE (RAF Rudloe Manor and RAF Boddington being the others) at a critical point in the Cold War. The unit was commanded by a Squadron Leader of the Engineering Branch and was divided into two flights, Engineering Flight and Operations Flight. As the unit operated 24 hours a day, a watch system was worked with a small engineering shift and a larger operations shift with a Warrant Officer running each watch.

== Units ==
The following units were here at some point:

- No. 1 Group Communication Flight RAF
- No. 1 Lancaster Finishing School RAF
- No. 5 Air Navigation School RAF
- No. 9 Squadron RAF
- No. 11 Base RAF
- No. 11 Service Flying Training School RAF
- No. 21 (Air Defence Missile) Wing RAF became No. 21 (Surface to Air Missile) Wing RAF
- No. 24 Gliding School RAF
- No. 50 Squadron RAF
- No. 57 Squadron RAF
- No. 71 Base RAF
- No. 100 Squadron RAF
- No. 101 Flying Refresher School RAF
- No. 110 (Hyderabad) Squadron RAF
- No. 230 (Heavy Bomber) Operational Conversion Unit RAF
- No. 304 Polish Bomber Squadron
- No. 305 Polish Bomber Squadron
- No. 408 Squadron RCAF
- No. 643 Gliding School RAF
- No. 1481 (Bomber) Gunnery Flight RAF
- No. 1481 (Bombing) Gunnery Flight RAF
- No. 1503 (Beam Approach Training) Flight RAF
- No. 1653 Heavy Conversion Unit RAF
- No. 1656 Heavy Conversion Unit RAF
- No. 1667 Heavy Conversion Unit RAF
- Air Bomber Training Flight (No. 1 Group) RAF
- Bomber Command Acceptance and Modification Unit RAF
- Bomber Command Bombing School RAF
- Bomber Command Modification Centre RAF
- Bombing Development Unit RAF
- Central Bomber Establishment RAF
- Flying Refresher School RAF
- RAF Technical College (Armament Division) RAF
- Strike Command Bombing School RAF

== See also ==
- Lindholme Gear
- List of former Royal Air Force stations
