= Herb Hoover =

American NACA experimental test pilot

- Born: Herbert Henry Hoover; May 18, 1912; Knoxville, Tennessee, United States
- Died: August 14, 1952 (aged 40); Burrowsville, Virginia, United States
- Cause of death: Parachute didn't open after bailing out of the B-45A Tornado bomber exploded that he was piloting
- Education: University of Tennessee
- Occupation: Experimental test pilot
- Known for: First civilian to break the sound barrier
- Awards: See Awards

Herbert Henry Hoover (May 18, 1912 – August 14, 1952) was an American NACA experimental test pilot who, on March 10, 1948, became the first civilian and second person to break the sound barrier, a feat for which he was awarded the Air Medal "for meritorious achievement while participating in aerial flight." Hoover flew the iconic orange Bell X-1 during this historic flight. During his short career with NACA, Hoover completed more than a dozen supersonic flights.

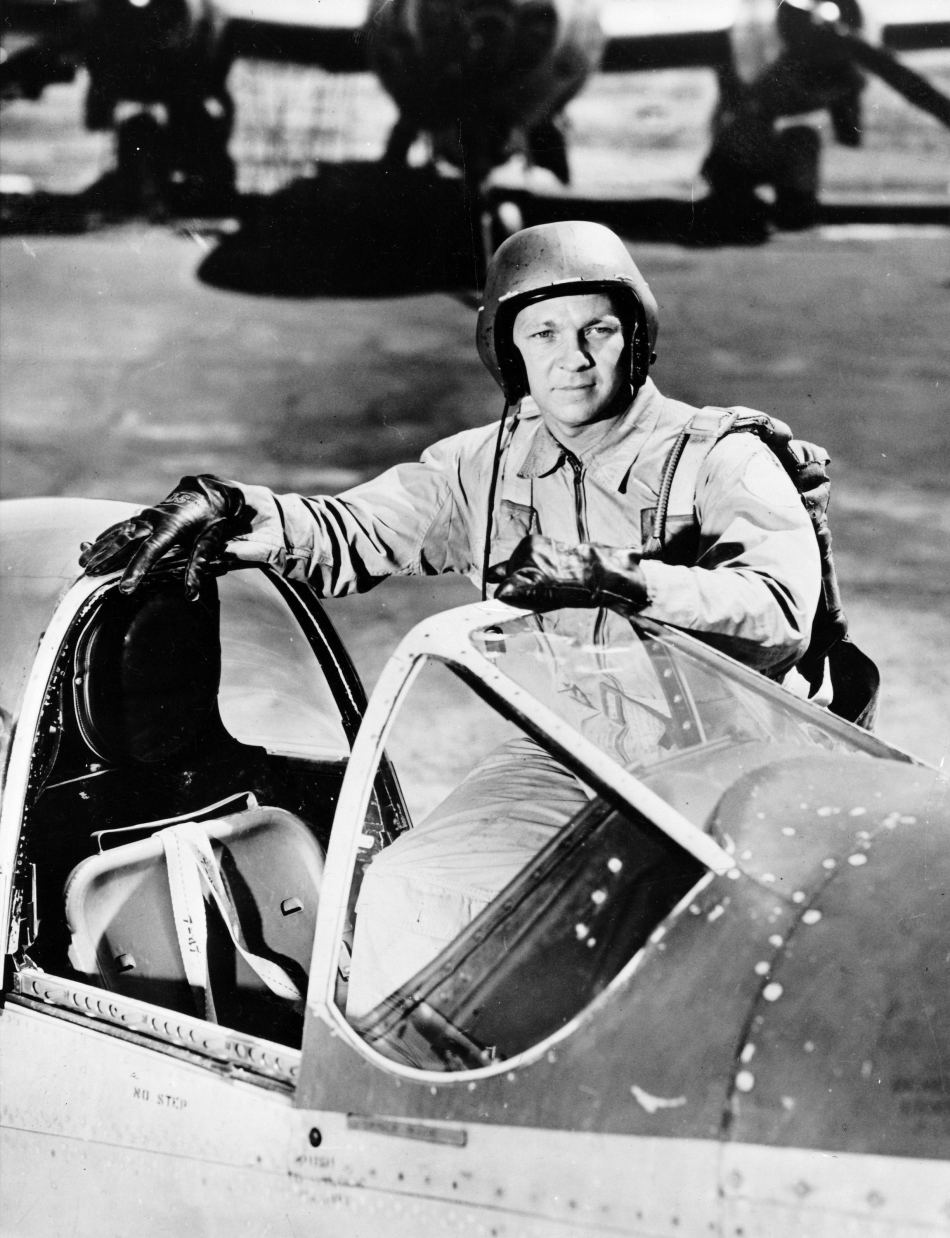
Herb Hoover, December 1948

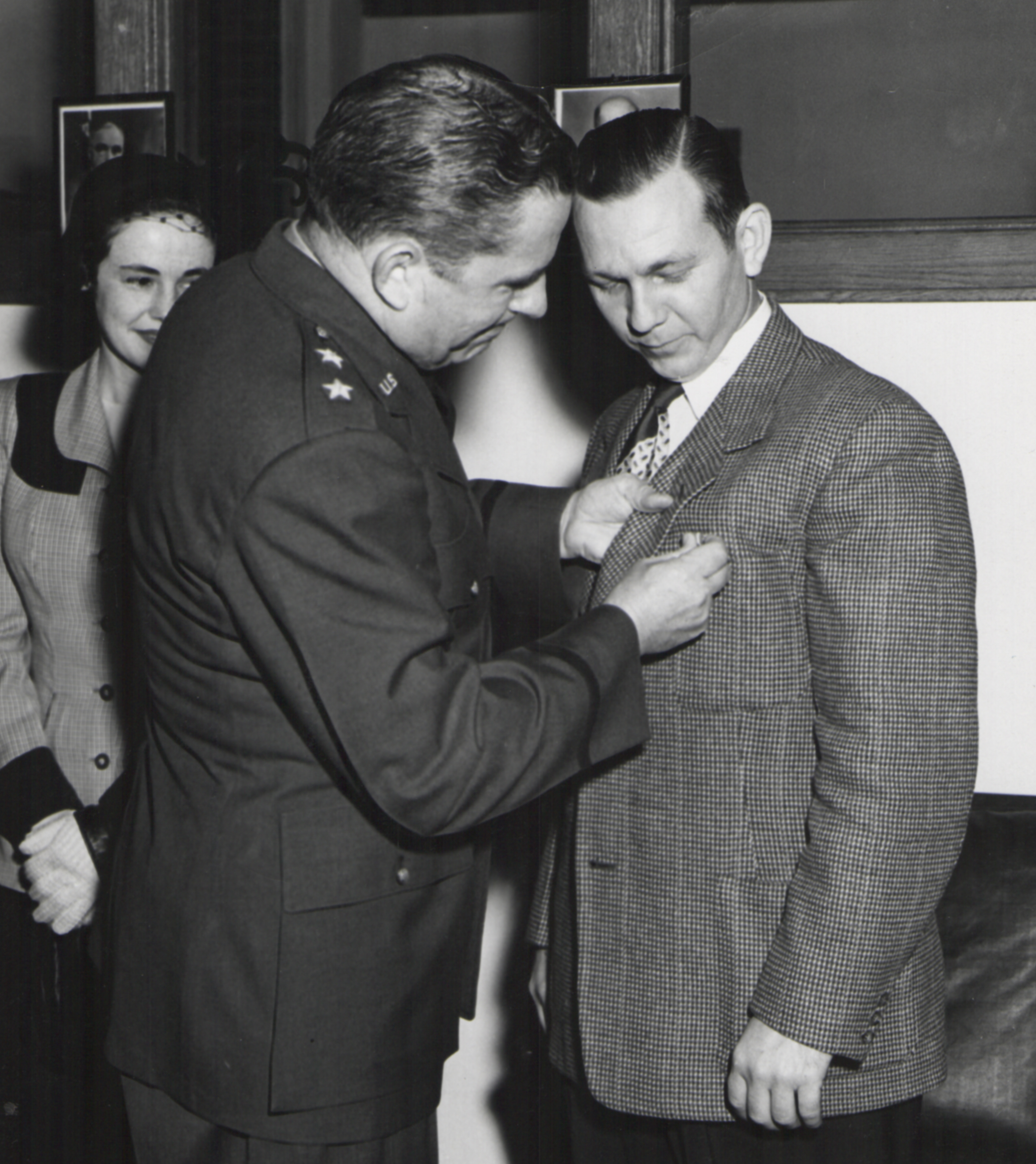
Hoover receives Octave Chanute award with a ceremonial pin in 1948

== Early life and career ==
Hoover was born in Knoxville, Tennessee and earned a degree in Mechanical Engineering from the University of Tennessee in 1934, then briefly served as a lieutenant in the US Army. In 1937, he got a job as a pilot with Standard Oil in South America and spent three and a half years flying equipment, staff, and hospital patients between camps in Venezuela, sometimes flying through bad weather. Hoover came to NACA in 1940, working out of the Hampton, Virginia campus, and volunteered to test fly the Lockheed XC-35, an experimental pressurized airplane with twin engines, through thunderstorms in an attempt to gauge the impact that the severe weather would have on the aircraft. The XC-35 is currently in long-term storage at the Smithsonian Institute's National Air and Space Museum.

Hoover was the first man to fly the experimental predecessor to the Bell X1, the Bell X-T. Per NASA, "He already had the reputation as a cool pilot in tight situations; once, during an instrumentation calibration flight in a NACA SB2C Helldiver the plane's cockpit canopy hood came loose in flight smashing Hoover across the forehead inflicting a deep cut that bled profusely. Though stunned by the blow and blinded by blood flowing into his eyes, Hoover instinctively retained control of the dive bomber, cleared his eyes, and despite his injuries, brought the plane back to Langley for an emergency landing. On another occasion, while he was firing a rocket-propelled model from a P-51 Mustang in a Mach 0.7 dive, the model disintegrated, showering the Mustang with wreckage. The wreckage punctured the plane's coolant tank, but again Hoover brought the plane in for a successful forced landing."

Hoover began flying the Bell X-1 in late 1947, although his first glide-familiarization flight was marred by a landing rough enough to cause the nosewheel to collapse, which "forced the rocket ship in the repair shop until mid-December".

On March 10, 1948, Hoover became the first civilian pilot to surpass Mach 1 (flying to Mach 1.065) and break the sound barrier, accomplishing this feat in the Bell X-1.

== Awards ==
- Chanute Flight Test Award (1948)
- David C. Schilling Award (1948)

== Death ==
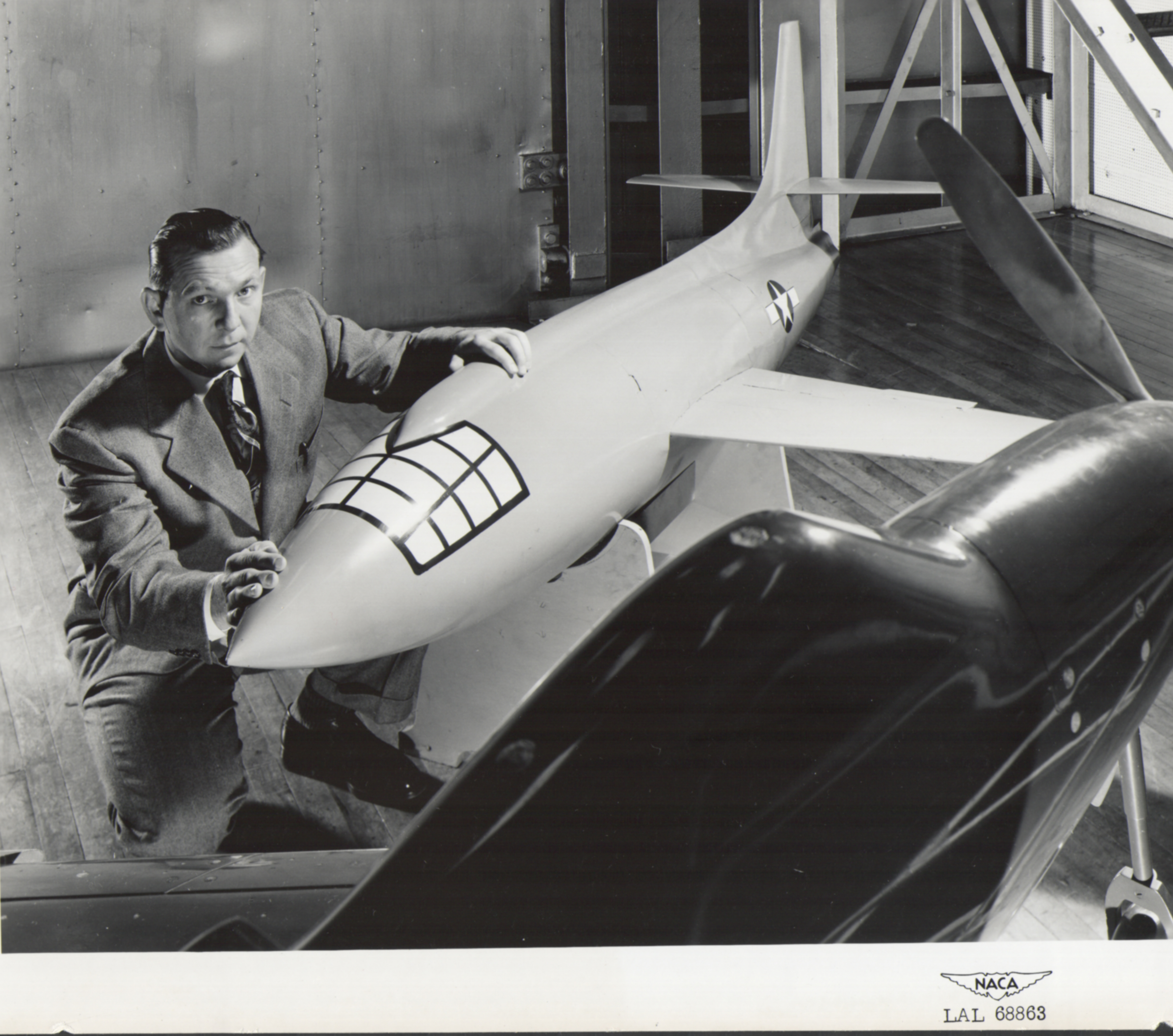
Hoover with a scale model of the Bell X1

Hoover was killed on August 14, 1952, while piloting a four-jet-engined B-45A Tornado bomber near Burrowsville, Virginia, about 45 miles (72 km) southeast of Richmond. Hoover and his copilot, John Harper, both parachuted from the exploding aircraft, with Harper landing safely, suffering only a bruised shoulder.

Although it was initially reported that Hoover had survived the crash and was searching for Harper, his body was found in the woods later that day, his hand on the ripcord of an unopened parachute. Later investigations revealed that he had been struck by pieces of the disintegrating aircraft, which had suffered two separate explosions. Hoover was 40 years old at the time of his death.
