= Listed buildings in Church Fenton =

Church Fenton is a civil parish in the county of North Yorkshire, England. It contains six listed buildings that are recorded in the National Heritage List for England. Of these, one is listed at Grade I, the highest of the three grades, and the others are at Grade II, the lowest grade. The parish contains the village of Church Fenton and the surrounding area. All the listed buildings are in the village, and consist of a church, two cross shafts, and three houses.

== Key ==
Grade	Criteria
I	Buildings of exceptional interest, sometimes considered to be internationally important
II	Buildings of national importance and special interest

== Buildings ==
Name and location	Photograph	Date	Notes	Grade
St Mary the Virgin's Church; 53.82463°N 1.22017°W		13th century	The church has been altered and extended through the centuries, including the addition of the tower in the 15th century, and a restoration in 1844 by G. Fowler Jones. It is built in magnesian limestone with a Welsh slate roof, and has a cruciform plan, consisting of a nave, a south aisle, a south porch, north and south transepts, a chancel, and a tower at the crossing. The tower has two storeys, a band, three-light bell openings with cusped heads, and an embattled parapet.	I
Cross shaft 53.82449°N 1.22018°W		Medieval	The cross shaft, which has been converted into a sundial, is in the churchyard of St Mary the Virgin's Church, to the south of the south transept. It is in magnesian limestone, and consists of an octagonal shaft about 1.5 metres (4 ft 11 in) high on an octagonal base. On the top is a bronze dial dating probably from the 19th century.	II
Village Cross; 53.82578°N 1.22111°W	—	Medieval	The cross shaft is in magnesian limestone, and consists of a broken octagonal shaft about 1.25 metres (4 ft 1 in) high on an octagonal base.	II
The Old Vicarage; 53.82615°N 1.21783°W		14th century (probable)	The house, which has been altered, extended and much restored, has a timber framed core, it encased in magnesian limestone and brick, partly rendered, and has a pantile roof with a lower row of stone slates. There is a single tall storey, and a T-shaped plan, with a main range of four bays, and a later rear range. The porch has a tiled roof, and the windows are a mix of casements and horizontally-sliding sashes. Inside, there is much exposed timber framing.	II
The Croft; 53.82524°N 1.22006°W	—	16th century (probable)	The house is timber framed, later rendered, with roofs of stone slate and pantile. There are two storeys, a main range of three bays, a rear outshut, and a later range at right angles with a hipped roof. On the front is a doorway, and the windows are casements. Inside, there is much exposed timber framing.	II
Ingledene; 53.82661°N 1.21846°W	—	Early 19th century	The house is in pinkish-brown brick, with a hipped Welsh slate roof, two storeys, three bays and a rear extension. The central doorway has pilasters, a fanlight, brackets and a pediment. The windows are sashes with flat rubbed brick arches.	II
