= Biggin, North Yorkshire =

Village and civil parish in North Yorkshire, England

Coordinates: 53.808230°N 1.175230°W

Biggin
- Location within North Yorkshire
- Population: 121 (2011 census)
- OS grid reference: SE544349
- Civil parish: Biggin
- Unitary authority: North Yorkshire
- Ceremonial county: North Yorkshire
- Region: Yorkshire and the Humber
- Country: England
- Sovereign state: United Kingdom
- Post town: LEEDS
- Postcode district: LS25
- Police: North Yorkshire
- Fire: North Yorkshire
- Ambulance: Yorkshire

Biggin is a village and civil parish in the county of North Yorkshire, England, north-west of Selby.

The village was historically part of the West Riding of Yorkshire until 1974. From 1974 to 2023 it was part of the Selby District, it is now administered by the unitary North Yorkshire Council.

== History ==
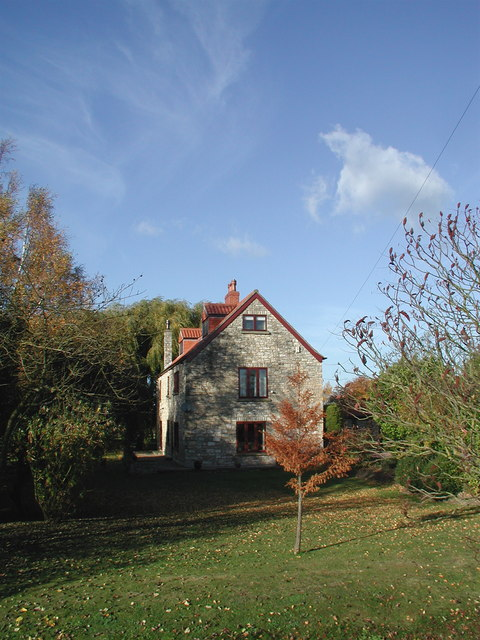
Mattram Hall, near Biggin

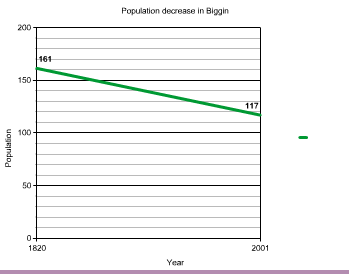
Biggin population decrease

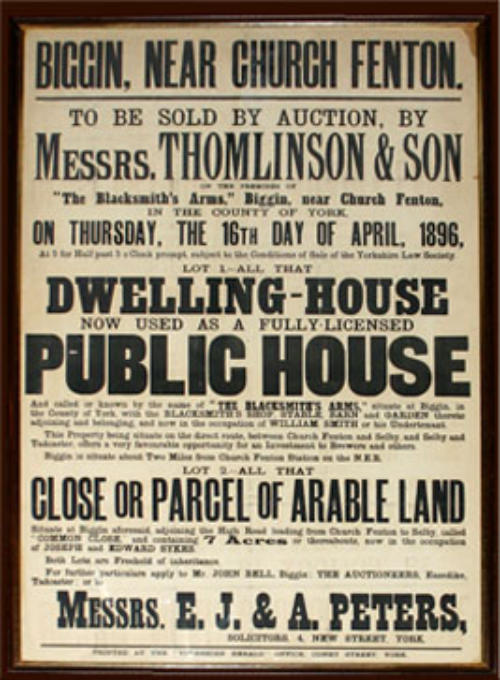
History of sale in 19th century

The name 'Biggin' is said to derive from "'bigging' (Middle English) A building; later an outbuilding, an outhouse". In 1820 Biggin was said to have a population of 164 people "BIGGIN, in the parish of Church Fenton, wapentake of Barkston-Ash, liberties of St. Peter and Pontefract; 6 miles SE. of Tadcaster, 7 from Selby, 11 from Pontefract. Pop. 164".

== Population ==
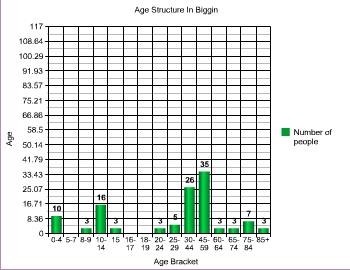
Age structure of Biggin 2001

In 2001 Biggin had a population of 117. 29.9% of people living in Biggin were between the ages of forty five to fifty nine and a further 22.2 per cent were thirty to forty four. By the time of the census 2011 the population had increased only slightly to 121. This suggests the area is fairly affluent as over half the population are at or near to an age where they should be peaking in their chosen careers. Only twenty two people are of an age to go to school in Biggin which is an indicator as to why there is no primary school for a five-mile radius.

The fact Biggin's population has actually decreased over a century isn't really surprising or significant for a parish of its size as more than eighty per cent of Britain's population now live in urban areas.

== Notable places ==
Biggin is located eighteen miles east of major city Leeds and is also thirteen miles south of York. Biggin does not have a railway station; there is one in Sherburn in Elmet which is a 3.7 mile journey by car and Church Fenton which is slightly closer at 3.1 miles. Church Fenton runs trains every hour to both Leeds and York, with Leeds taking as little as twenty-eight minutes and York just sixteen Church Fenton's station is favourable for most Biggin residents.

There are no Primary or Secondary schools within Biggin however there are forty-nine within the Selby district, giving parents a wide choice if prepared to travel. The most local primary school to Biggin is Sherburn Hungate Community Primary school which is just under five miles away.

Oxmoor Lane acts as the main road running through the centre of Biggin. Driving south down Oxmoor Lane will lead you out of Biggin and on to a rural B road the B1222 leading to the A63.

== Economy and climate ==
The Blacksmith Arms lies in the centre of Biggin along Oxmoor Lane. It was a former dwelling-house which became a public house after its sale in the late 19th century. It is currently the only trader in Biggin. It is a pub with great history to the local area, with records dating back over a hundred years.
