= Allen Rowley =

British journalist and aviation author

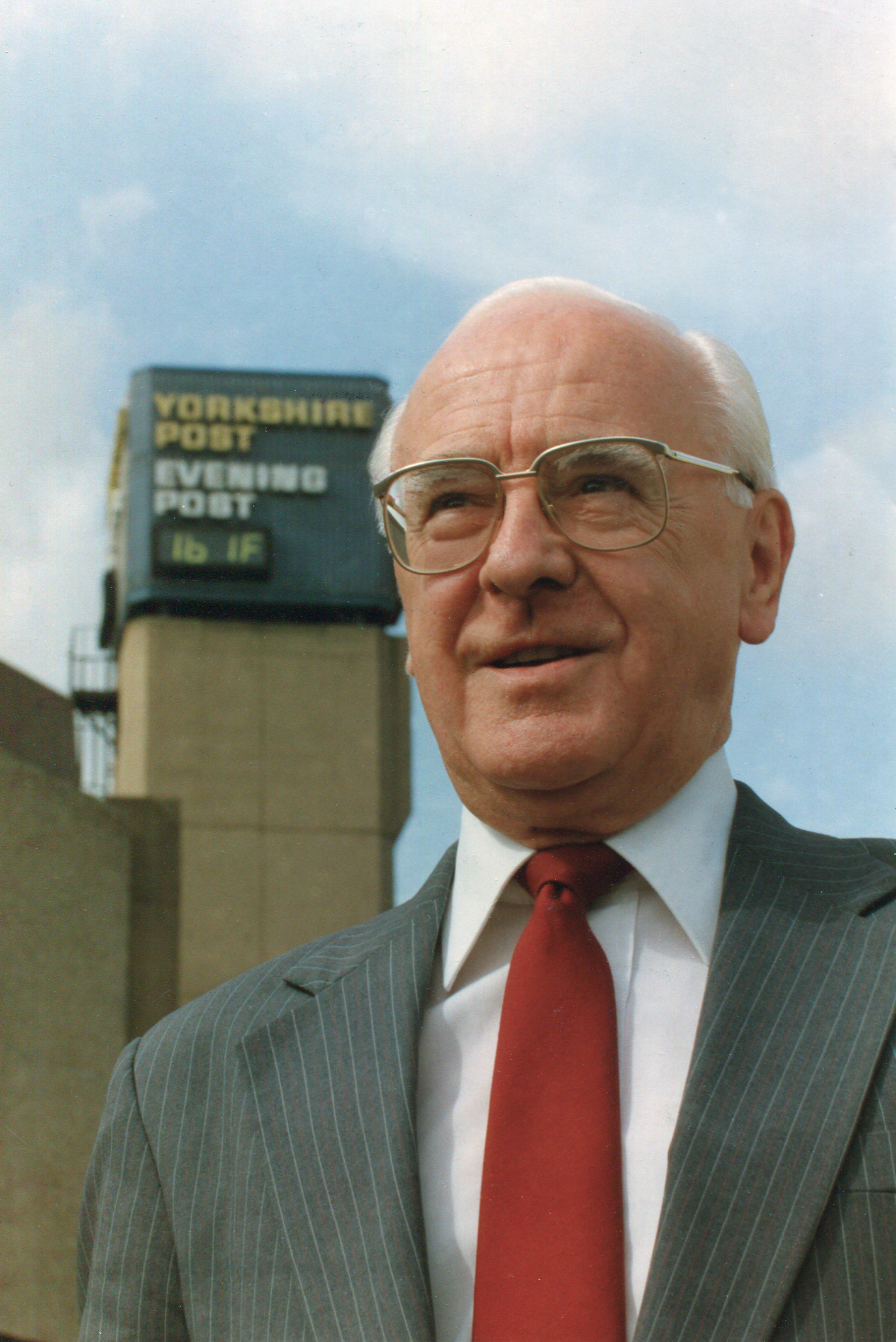
- Born: 1927; Thornhill, Dewsbury
- Died: 8 November 2006 (aged 78–79)
- Known for: Journalist, writer

Allen Rowley (1927–2006) was a British journalist, aviation correspondent and author. He wrote several books, including the first publication that contained information about all British airports.

== Early life and education ==
Allen Rowley was born in Dewsbury in 1927. He enrolled in art school, but in 1942 left to become a trainee reporter on the Dewsbury District News.

== Career ==
After the war Rowley joined the Wakefield Express as a reporter and feature writer. He wrote a number of articles during a visit to America and flew in a Super Sabre becoming one of the first British people to fly at 1000mph.

Rowley worked at eight different newspapers, including the Dewsbury Reporter and the Yorkshire Evening News in Doncaster. At the Yorkshire Evening News he was reporter then feature writer and deputy features editor He later joined The Sunday People in London. He returned to Yorkshire when an aviation correspondent position at the Yorkshire Evening News became available. He later was employed in the same role at the Yorkshire Evening Post. His experience and interest in aviation led him to produce a number of books on airports, including the first guide to British airports.

Rowley took part in many important flights and special operations, including the first transatlantic flights of 707 and DC8 aircraft of various airlines. He wrote articles about the American missile programme and was the first journalist to uncover that American missiles were to be stationed on British RAF stations. His article for the Yorkshire Evening News about the aerial refuelling of atom bombers by night led to an award from the United States Ar Force.

== Air displays ==
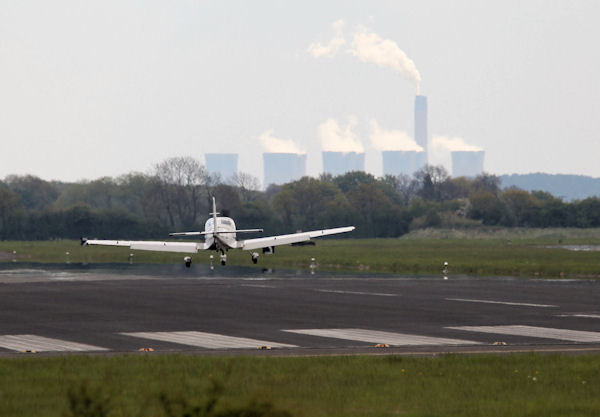
RAF Church Fenton

Allen's association with the Soldiers, Sailors, Airmen and Families Association (SSAFA) began in 1954, and he was chief organiser and commentator at the Yorkshire Air Pageant, held at Leeds Bradford Airport (LBA), from 1958 to 1962. When the pageant moved to RAF Church Fenton he continued to be the organiser and commentator until 1989. The displays raised over a million pounds for charity.

== Retirement and death ==
In retirement in Cookridge, Leeds, Rowley continued to write several books and articles on aviation and rail topics. He died on 8 November 2006.

== Selected works ==
Leeds-Bradford Airport Official Handbook (1961)

Official Handbook (1965)

East Midlands Airport, Castle Donington (1965)

British Airports and Air Traveller, edited by Allen Rowley (1966, 1967–68,69)

Memory Lane, Leeds: A Collection of Pictorial Memories of Leeds from the Archives of the Yorkshire Evening Post (1996)

Yorkshire steam: A Nostalgic Look at Railways in the Ridings Vols 1–5 (1974)

The Yorkshire Post and Leeds Mercury: The War years (1995)

Almost Forgotten Leeds, film presented by Harry Gration, script by Allen Rowley (1996)

Classic Steam: A Superb Collection of Pictures, Specially Selected From the Archives of the Yorkshire Post (1997)

Leeds: A Look Down Memory Lane (2003)

== Awards and legacy ==
In 1955, Rowley received an award from the American Strategic Air Command for his report on airborne refuelling of B-47 bombers.

In 1969 Rowley was awarded the Polish Gold Cross for helping Polish ex-airmen after the Second World War.

In 1989 Rowley became only the sixth person to be awarded the Prince Michael of Kent Award for his charity work.

In 2002 he was made an Honorary Life Member of the Yorkshire Air Museum and Allied Air Forces Memorial.

Rowley played a major role in the successful campaign to save the Tetley’s dray horses. One of the Shire horses was later named Rowley after him.

The housing estate built on the site of the Officers’ Mess at Church Fenton has been named Rowley Fields, after Allen Rowley.

There is a gallery of photographs on the Church Fenton website that celebrates Rowley's achievements.

A collection of material relating to the life and work of Allen Rowley is held at Leeds Central Library.
