= Leeds East Airport =

Airport in Church Fenton, North Yorkshire, England

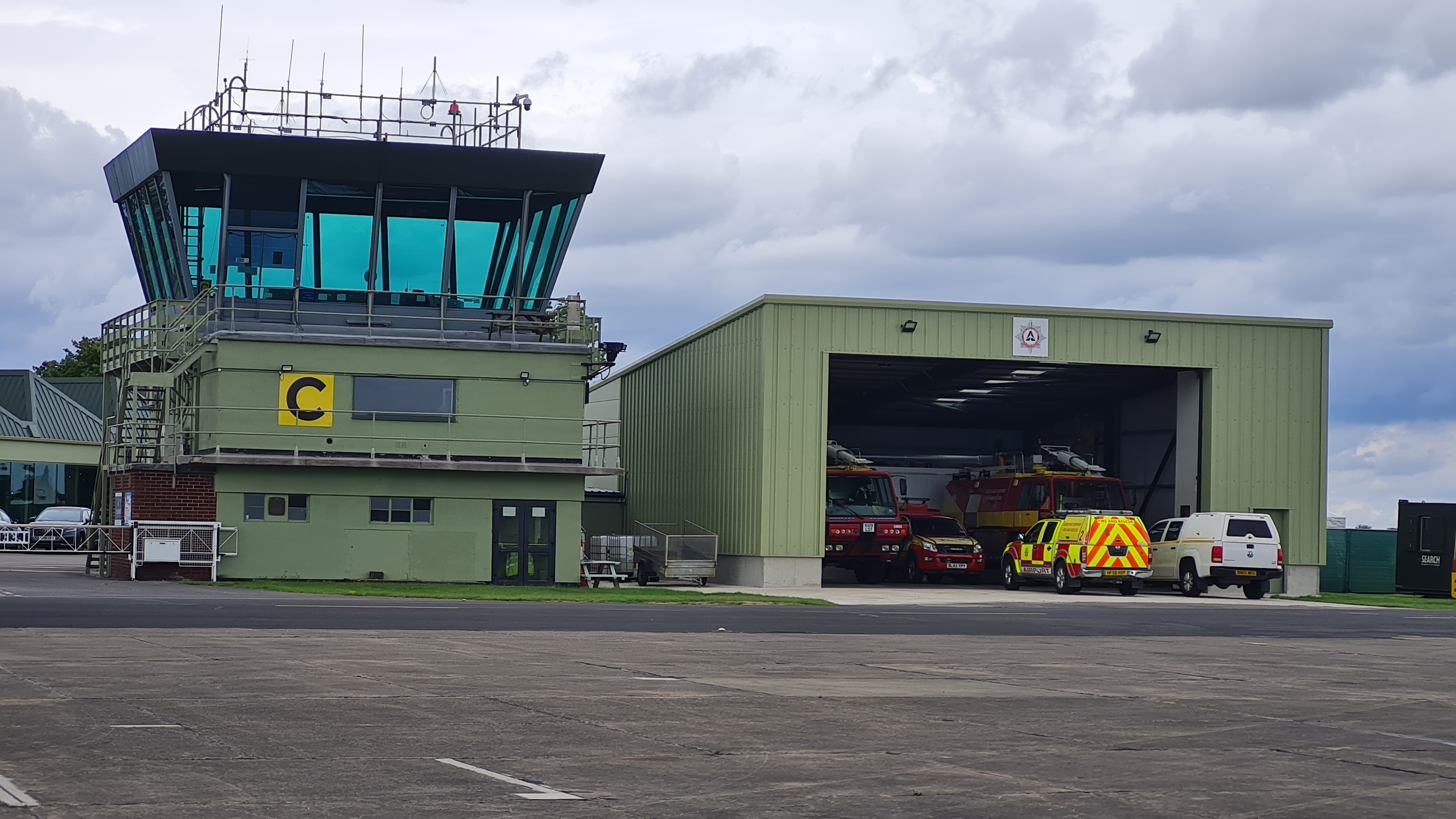
- IATA: none; ICAO: EGCM

Summary
- Airport type: Private
- Owner: Makin Enterprises
- Operator: Makin Enterprises
- Serves: Leeds, West Yorkshire | York, North Yorkshire
- Location: Church Fenton, North Yorkshire
- Built: 1936
- Elevation AMSL: 30 ft / 9 m
- Coordinates: 53°50′04″N 001°11′44″W
- Website: leedseastairport.co.uk/

Map
- Location in North Yorkshire

Runways
Direction	Length		Surface
Direction	m	ft	Surface
06/24	1,826	5,991	Asphalt

Leeds East Airport Church Fenton (ICAO: EGCM), formerly RAF Church Fenton, is an airport and former Royal Air Force station located 4.3 miles (6.9 km) south-east of Tadcaster, North Yorkshire, England and 6.3 miles (10.1 km) north-west of Selby, North Yorkshire, near the village of Church Fenton. The airport has had a licensing application from the UK Civil Aviation Authority rejected. This led to the scrapping of plans to allow regular scheduled passenger flights and charter flights to various European destinations. The airport has subsequently been awarded an operating licence for private use.

== History ==
=== RAF Church Fenton ===
The airfield was originally a Royal Air Force station known as RAF Church Fenton. It was declared open on 1 April 1937 and on 19 April the first station commander Wing Commander W.E. Swann assumed command. Within two months No. 71 Squadron RAF had arrived with the Gloster Gladiator.

It saw the peak of its activity during the years of the Second World War, when it served within the defence network of fighter bases of the RAF providing protection for the Leeds, Bradford, Sheffield and Humber estuary industrial regions.

After the war it at first retained its role as a fighter base, being among the first to receive modern jet aircraft, namely the Gloster Meteor and the Hawker Hunter. In later years, its role was mainly flight training. No. 7 Flying Training School was based here between 1962 and 1966 and again between 1979 and 1992, equipped with Hunting Aircraft Jet Provost T3 trainers.

For some years it was home to the Royal Navy Elementary Flying Training School (RNEFTS) using the Scottish Aviation Bulldog, and again 1979–1992, triggered by the introduction of the Panavia Tornado, being the first station to receive the new turboprop-powered Short Tucano T.1 basic fast jet trainers. From 1998 to 2003 Church Fenton was the RAF's main Elementary Flying Training airfield.

=== Station closure ===
The last Station Commander of a self-determining RAF Church Fenton was Squadron Leader David Morris, who had trained on Chipmunk aircraft at RAF Church Fenton in 1973. Sqn Ldr Morris returned to RAF Church Fenton in 1991 as the Officer Commanding Station Services Squadron, to prepare the as then autonomous station for yet another closure, and transfer into the control of RAF Linton on Ouse as a satellite airfield and Enhanced Relief Landing Ground.

The gates of the fully independent RAF Church Fenton were closed at 12:00 on 31 December 1992, However, with its assets such as the Officers' Mess subsequently razed to the ground to save on maintenance and the married quarters and other buildings sold off piecemeal by the MoD, RAF Church Fenton's runways and aviation infrastructure were alienated from the remainder of the administrative site and remained operational until 2013.

On 25 March 2013 it was announced that RAF Church Fenton would close by the end of 2013. The units would be relocated to RAF Linton on Ouse by 31 December 2013. By 19 December 2013, all units had relocated and the airfield was closed. Some equipment was to be relocated to RAF Topcliffe. MoD security continued to secure the site until disposal. A NOTAM was issued suspending the air traffic zone (ATZ) at the end of 2013.

== Current use ==
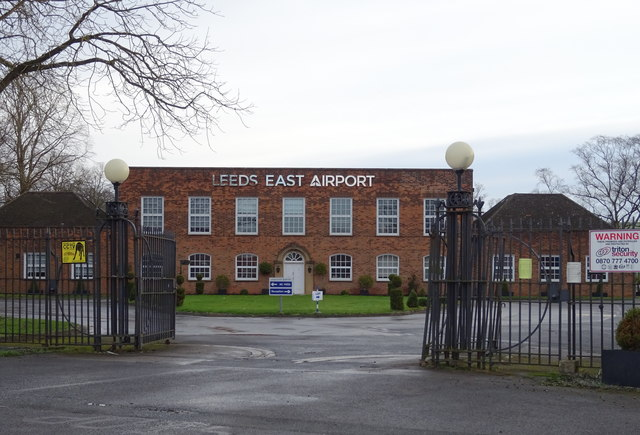
Buildings at Leeds East Airport

The site was sold on 23 December 2014 to Makins Yorkshire Strawberries except for a section containing the Air Cadets. Makins intends to keep the airfield operational.

In February 2015, Makins Enterprises (the new airfield owners) launched their new website, renaming the airfield as 'Leeds East Airport', with the slogan "Yorkshire's newest aviation destination." Makins was planning on targeting the business jet market, while also running a flying school and other ventures.

The second series of the ITV drama Victoria was shot at a hangar onsite in 2017. In June 2023, the site was granted planning permission to develop 15,000 square metres (160,000 sq ft) alongside the existing hangars into three sound stages/studios and office space. The owners hope to make the site a "state-of-the-art commercial TV and film studio facility, creating opportunities for the creative, digital and media industries."
