= Sherburn-in-Elmet Airfield =

Airfield in North Yorkshire, England

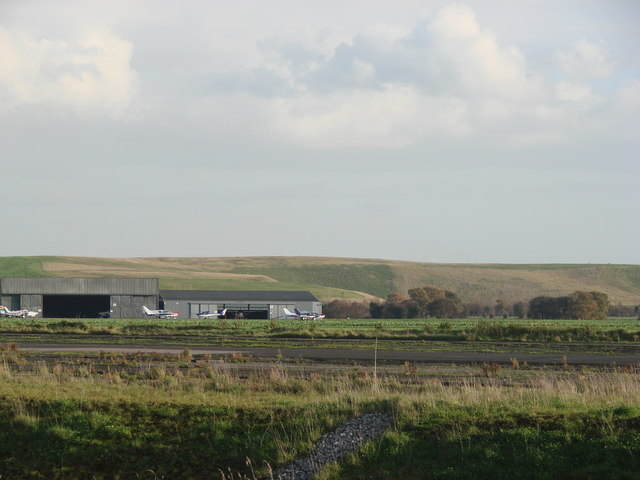
- Proving ground
- IATA: none; ICAO: EGCJ

Summary
- Airport type: Public
- Operator: Sherburn Aero Club Ltd
- Location: Sherburn in Elmet, North Yorkshire, England
- Elevation AMSL: 26 ft / 8 m
- Coordinates: 53°47′03″N 001°13′04″W
- Website: www.sherburnaeroclub.com

Map
- Location in North Yorkshire

Runways
Direction	Length		Surface
Direction	m	ft	Surface
11/29	830	2,723	Tarmac
11G/29G	616	2,021	Grass
06/24	793	2,602	Grass
01/19	585	1,919	Grass
- Sources: UK AIP at NATS

Sherburn-in-Elmet Airfield (ICAO: EGCJ) is located 1.5 nautical miles (2.8 km; 1.7 mi) east of Sherburn in Elmet village and 5.5 NM (10.2 km; 6.3 mi) west of Selby, North Yorkshire, England.

== Pre-War and Wartime history ==
In the 1920s, the Yorkshire Aeroplane Club began operating here. The novelist, pilot, and aeronautical engineer Nevil Shute was a member, and on the club's management committee. At the time, the club was flying de Havilland Moths. In his memoir, Slide Rule, Shute records that ". . . the Yorkshire Club quickly attracted a fair cross-section of young Yorkshire men and women, so that a Sunday spent at the Club was a merry Sunday." He also met his future wife, Frances Mary Heaton, a physician, at the club. After establishing Airspeed Ltd., an aircraft manufacturing firm, he personally flew the first two test flights of the company's first aircraft here. It was a glider, known as the Tern, and was launched using a "very old Buick car" pulling a steel cable.

During the Second World War the airfield was used as a Royal Air Force station. From 1940 Blackburn Aircraft used a Ministry of Aircraft Production factory here to build 1699 Fairey Swordfish naval torpedo aircraft.

The Airborne Forces Experimental Establishment (AFEE) was moved from RAF Ringway to Sherburn on 17 June 1942. It was charged with developing the means to deploy allied airborne forces and supplies on operations by Military glider, Parachute and other means. The AFEE moved to RAF Beaulieu on 4 January 1945.

The following units were also here at some point:

- No. 2 (Coastal) Operational Training Unit RAF
- No. 7 Ferry Pilots Pool ATA became No. 7 Ferry Pool ATA
- No. 30 Gliding School RAF
- No. 46 Squadron RAF (1941)
- No. 73 Squadron RAF
- 885 Naval Air Squadron
- Leeds University Air Squadron

== Post-war operations ==
Post-war, Sherburn has been used by private pilots and by aero clubs for training and leisure flying. The Yorkshire Aeroplane Club was based here for many years and organised several international air rallies in the early 1950s.

In addition to the listed runways, there is a closed/un-maintained 1,950-metre (6,400 ft) paved former runway parallel to, and about 95 metres (310 ft) northwest of, the current 06/24 grass runway.
