= No. 1 Operational Conversion Unit RAAF =

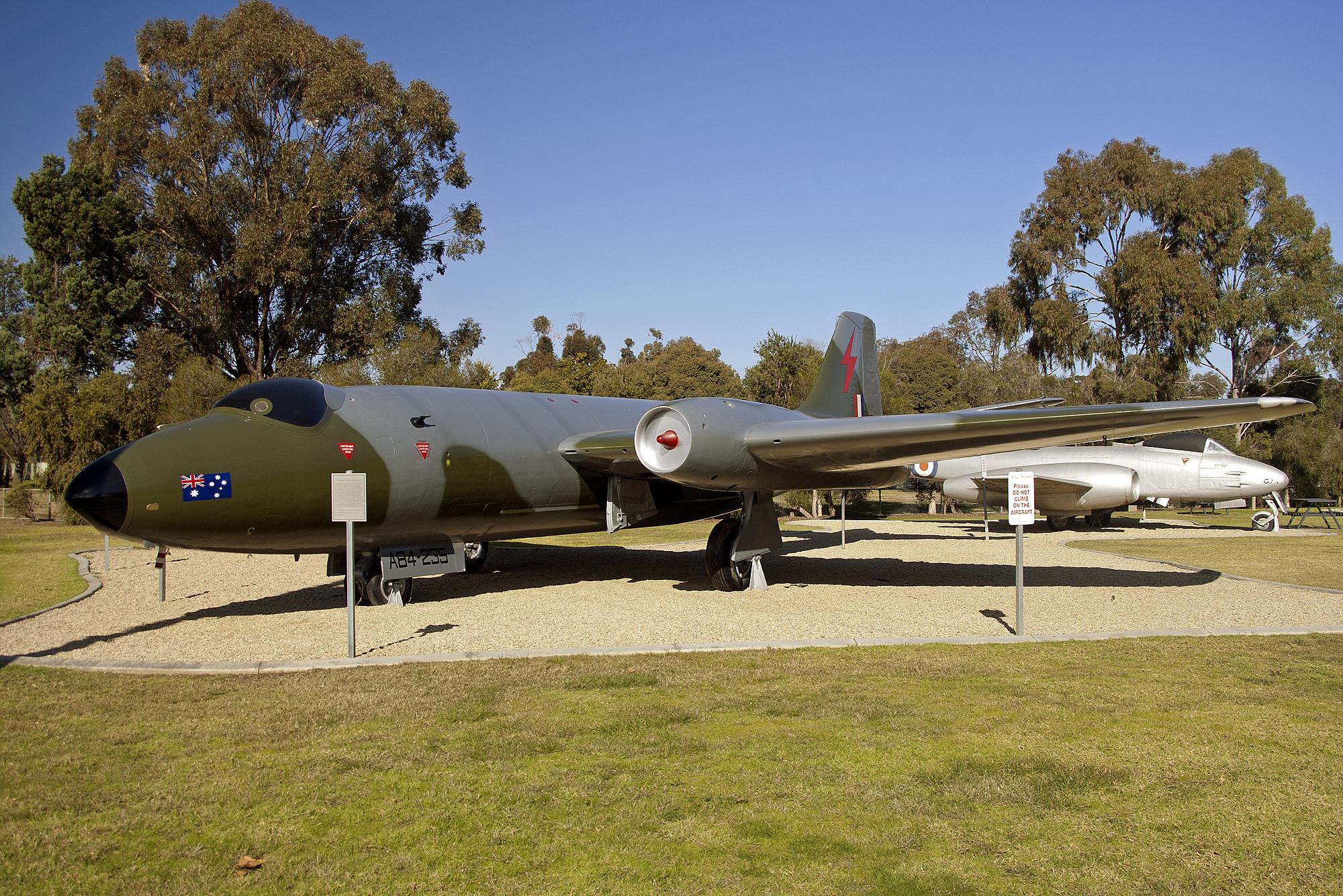
- Canberra Mk.20 flown by No. 1 Operational Conversion Unit in 1970–71 following service in the Vietnam War, now on display at RAAF Base Wagga, New South Wales.
- Active: 1959–71
- Country: Australia
- Branch: Royal Australian Air Force
- Role: Bomber conversion and operational training
- Part of: No. 82 Wing (1959–68)
- Garrison/HQ: RAAF Base Amberley

Aircraft flown
- Bomber: English Electric Canberra

No. 1 Operational Conversion Unit (No. 1 OCU) was an operational training unit of the Royal Australian Air Force (RAAF). Formed in January 1959 at RAAF Base Amberley, Queensland, its role was to convert pilots and navigators to the English Electric Canberra bombers flown by Nos. 1, 2 and 6 Squadrons. The unit's complement of Canberras included T.4 and Mk.21 dual-control trainers, and Mk.20 bombers. Originally a component of No. 82 Wing, No. 1 OCU became an independent unit at Amberley in April 1968, its focus being the provision of operationally ready pilots for service with No. 2 Squadron in the Vietnam War. No. 1 OCU was disbanded in June 1971, following the withdrawal of No. 2 Squadron from South-East Asia. By then the RAAF's only Canberra unit, No. 2 Squadron ran its own conversion courses before disbanding in 1982.

== History ==
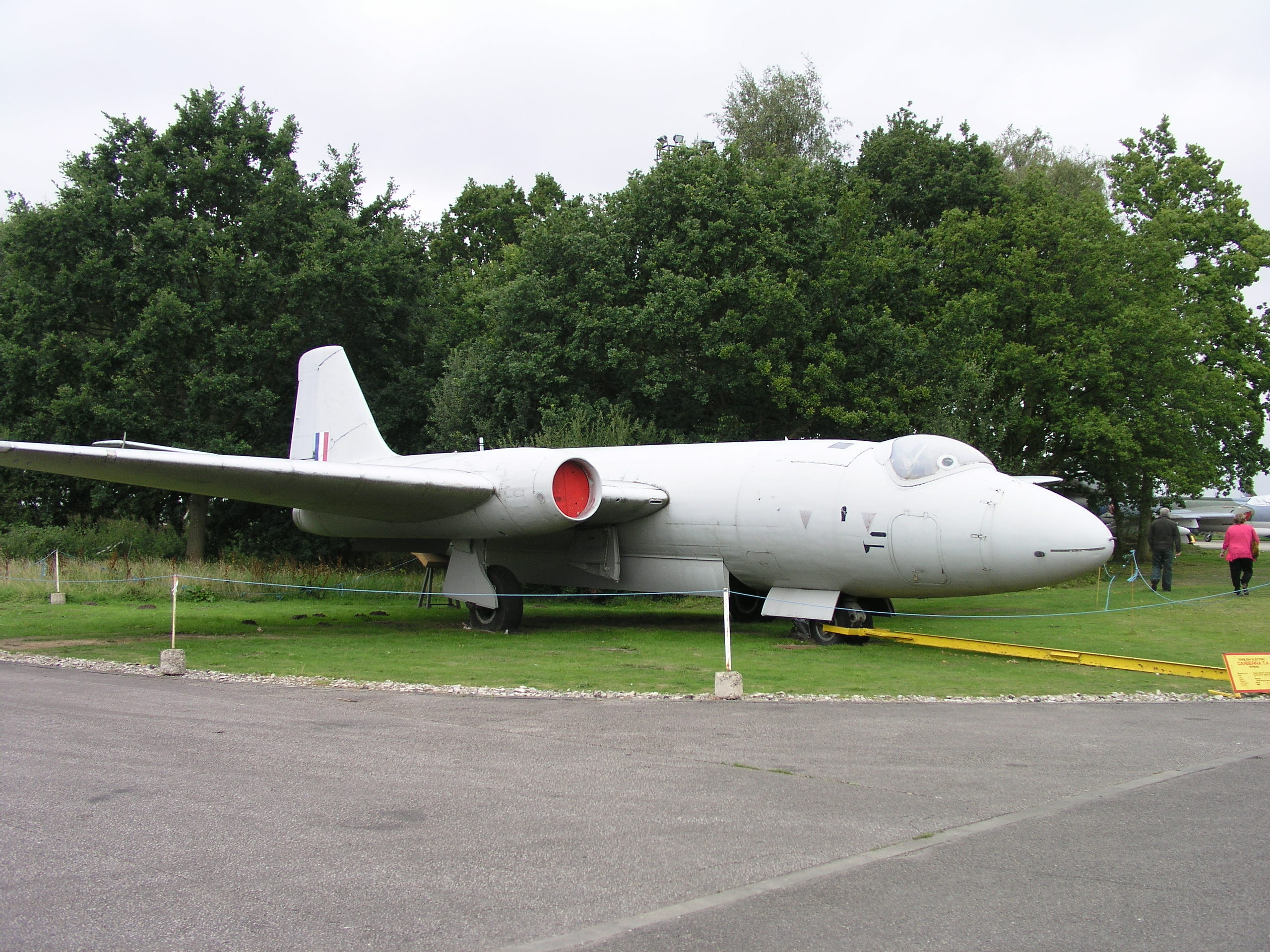
Canberra T.4, an example of a three-seat, dual-control model employed for conversion training at No. 1 OCU.

During World War II, the Royal Australian Air Force (RAAF) established several operational training units (OTUs) to convert recently graduated pilots from advanced trainers to combat aircraft, and to add fighting ability to the flying skills they had already learned. Post-war demobilisation saw the disbandment of these OTUs, and operational conversion of new pilots became the responsibility of front-line squadrons. This practice impacted upon the squadrons' standard duties, and the advent of the Korean War and introduction of jet aircraft further necessitated a more formal training system. The Air Force's initial move in this direction was to re-establish No. 2 (Fighter) Operational Training Unit at RAAF Base Williamtown, New South Wales, in March 1952; it was renamed No. 2 (Fighter) Operational Conversion Unit in September 1958.

In December 1953, No. 82 (Bomber) Wing, headquartered at RAAF Base Amberley, Queensland, took delivery of Australia's first jet bomber, the English Electric Canberra. Over the next five years, forty-eight Canberras built in Australia by the Government Aircraft Factories (GAF) re-equipped all three of the wing's flying units, Nos. 1, 2 and 6 Squadrons. During this period, operational training of new bomber aircrew was performed "in-house" by the wing, primarily by No. 6 Squadron. Aside from its adverse effect on regular flying duties, the task was made technically challenging and potentially dangerous by virtue of the Canberra being designed for only one pilot, with a single control column. On 12 January 1959, No. 1 (Bomber) Operational Conversion Unit (No. 1 OCU) was formed at Amberley. Coming under the control of No. 82 Wing, its purpose was to convert pilots and navigators to the Canberra, and train them for operations with Nos. 1, 2 and 6 Squadrons. On establishment, the unit was commanded by Squadron Leader B.F.M. Rachinger, and equipped with Mk.20 bombers and T.4 trainers. The T.4 was a dual-control model with three seats; the pilot and instructor sat side by side at the front of the cockpit, and the navigator was seated behind them. Two of these models had been purchased from Britain. The unit was subsequently allocated Mk.21 trainers; GAF built seven of these dual-control models by converting five early Mk.20s and two British-built B.2 bombers. Student aircrew underwent bombing and navigation instruction, as well as simulated operations. The first training course graduated in April 1959.

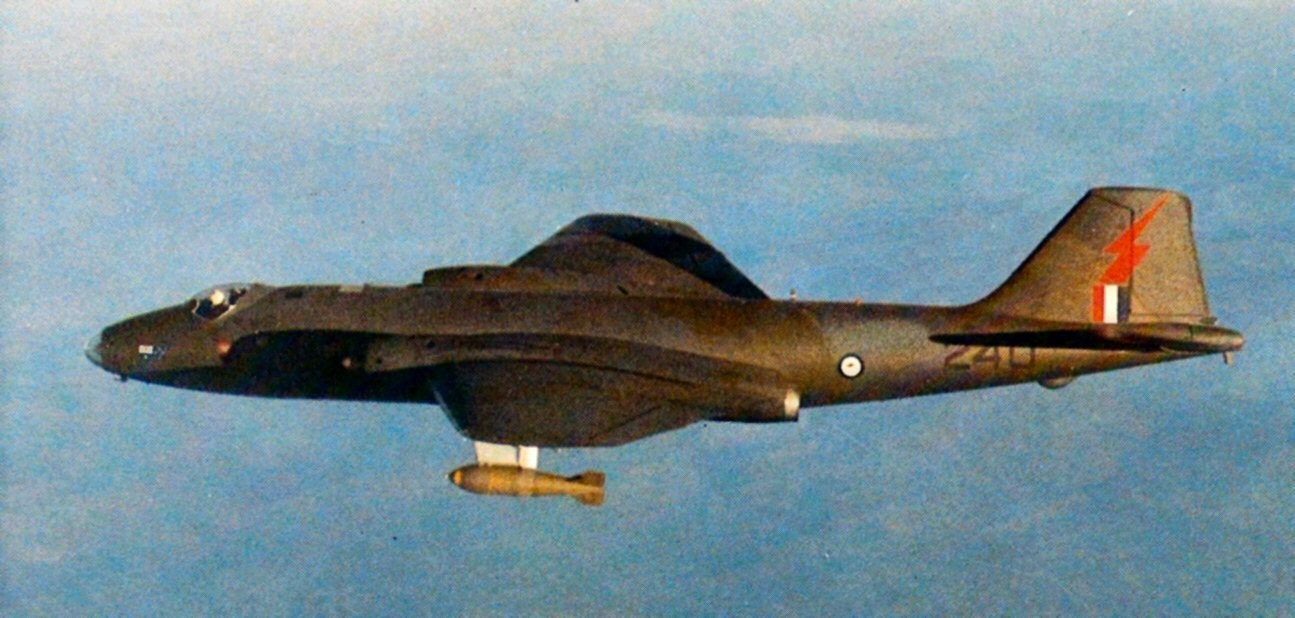
No. 2 Squadron Canberra over Vietnam, March 1970; from April 1968 until it disbanded in June 1971, No. 1 OCU trained aircrew in Australia for combat duty with the squadron.

As well as training, over the course of No. 1 OCU's existence its aircrews flew operational sorties involving naval cooperation, aerial photography, target towing and radar targeting, and participated in exercises in Malaysia, Papua New Guinea, and New Zealand. During runway upgrades at Amberley in mid-1962, the unit was based for a month at RAAF Base Richmond, New South Wales. Later that year, it briefly maintained a detachment at RAAF Base Townsville, Queensland. On 11 September 1964, one of its Canberras was intercepted by a Sabre fighter of No. 76 Squadron based at RAAF Base Darwin, Northern Territory, as part of Operation Handover, a little-known contingency plan put into effect during Konfrontasi to guard against possible attack by Indonesian forces following the recent establishment of the Federation of Malaysia. No. 1 OCU suffered a fatal accident on 16 February 1965, when a Canberra Mk.21 ran off the runway and crashed at Amberley, killing both crew members. The unit was made independent of No. 82 Wing in April 1968. Its role from then on was to provide trained crews solely for No. 2 Squadron, which was on active duty in the Vietnam War. At the same time, maintenance responsibilities for the Canberras transferred from No. 482 Squadron to No. 1 OCU, along with relevant staff and equipment. Nos. 1 and 6 Squadrons effectively ceased operations while their crews underwent conversion to the General Dynamics F-111C, expected to enter service soon afterwards. Delivery of the F-111s was delayed, so Nos. 1 and 6 Squadrons began operating leased F-4E Phantoms as an interim strike force in 1970.

To prepare aircrew for their rotation through No. 2 Squadron in Vietnam, No. 1 OCU students participated in exercises such as Combat Skyspot in August 1968, which utilised radar controlled by No. 30 Squadron, and Strait Kris in September–October 1969, in conjunction with the Australian Army. The unit lost two more aircrew when a Canberra M.21 on a training flight crashed near Amberley on 23 March 1970. From 21 March to 25 April 1971, four of the unit's aircraft flew 10,000 miles around Australia to conduct seven flying displays as part of the RAAF's Golden Jubilee celebrations. Having completed thirty-six conversion courses in its twelve years of operation, No. 1 OCU was disbanded on 9 June 1971, following the withdrawal of No. 2 Squadron from Vietnam. Unit staff were transferred to No. 2 Squadron, which continued to operate the Canberra and carry out its own operational conversion until disbanding in June 1982. Ten of No. 1 OCU's fifteen Canberras were put into storage and the remainder, including surviving Mk.21 trainers, were taken on by No. 2 Squadron. When the F-111C eventually entered service with No. 82 Wing in 1973, No. 6 Squadron again took responsibility for conversion training, while No. 1 Squadron acted as the lead strike unit. Canberra A84-236, which was allocated to No. 1 OCU in 1968 and 1970 when not in service with No. 2 Squadron in Vietnam, went on display at RAAF Museum, Point Cook, Victoria, in 1982.
