= No. 82 Wing Training Flight RAAF =

No. 82 Wing Training Flight
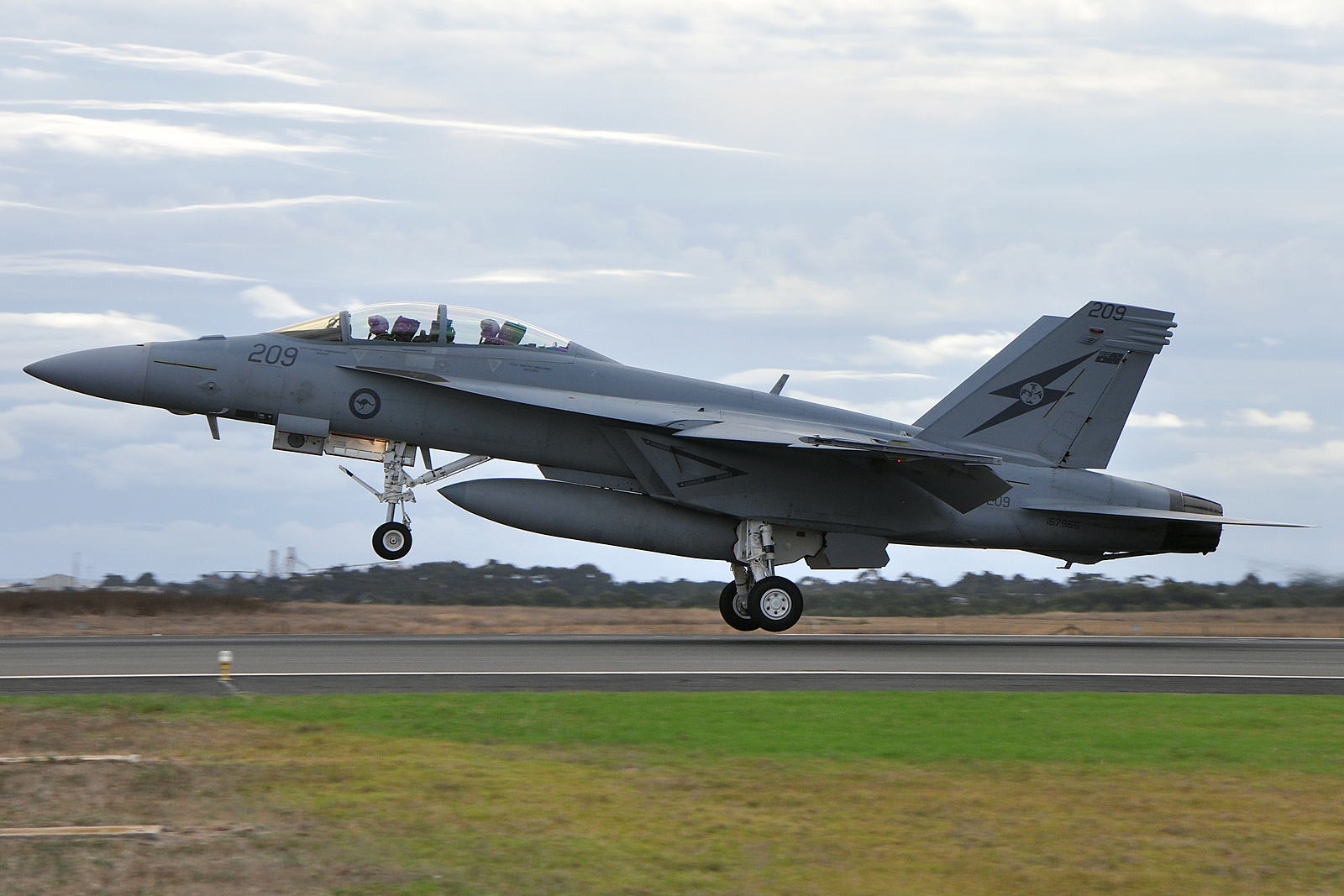
- An Australian F/A-18F Super Hornet
- Active: January 2020–current
- Country: Australia
- Branch: Royal Australian Air Force
- Role: Training
- Part of: No. 82 Wing RAAF
- Base: RAAF Base Amberley

Aircraft flown
- Fighter: Boeing F/A-18F Super Hornet

No. 82 Wing Training Flight is a Royal Australian Air Force flight which was established in January 2020 to provide training for No. 82 Wing. It is equipped with six Boeing F/A-18F Super Hornets.

== History and role ==
Until 2015, No. 6 Squadron was the operational conversion unit responsible for preparing RAAF aircrew to operate Boeing F/A-18F Super Hornet aircraft. During that year, the squadron relinquished the training role ahead of being re-equipped with Boeing EA-18G Growler electronic attack aircraft. RAAF Super Hornet and Growler aircrew subsequently undertook operational conversion training in the United States with United States Navy units. A flight responsible for refresher training was also established within No. 1 Squadron, the RAAF's operational F/A-18F unit.

No. 82 Wing Training Flight was established in January 2020. It forms part of a two-year trial of returning most Super Hornet operational conversation training in Australia. As part of the trial, some aircrew will be assigned to the flight after completing their initial fighter training with No. 76 Squadron. The RAAF is hopeful that the trial will lead to better outcomes than training the aircrew in the United States, including by ensuring that they are familiar with Australian operational procedures from the outset, as these are not taught by the US Navy.

Upon establishment, No. 82 Wing Training Flight was assigned six F/A-18Fs. The unit's inaugural commander also doubles as the executive officer of No. 82 Wing.

From 26 November to 9 December 2020, Exercise Gauntlet Strike was held at RAAF Base Tindal in the Northern Territory, providing the final qualification activity for operational conversion courses for aircrew trainees.

The flight remained active as of March 2023, when it conducted the periodic Exercise Crimson Dawn as the final stage of the eight month long F/A-18F conversion course. In December 2023 the Department of Defence noted that the most recent iteration of Exercise Crimson Dawn had been conducted by a unit called No. 1 Squadron Training Flight.
