= No. 482 Squadron RAAF =

- Inside the "Taj Mahal", No. 482 Squadron's main hangar at RAAF Base Amberley, on a typical day. Shown are General Dynamics F-111C swing-wing bombers and visiting CT/4 Airtrainers.
- Active: 1942–92
- Allegiance: Australia
- Branch: Royal Australian Air Force
- Role: Aircraft maintenance
- Part of: No. 82 Wing (1946–92)
- Garrison/HQ: RAAF Base Amberley
- Motto: Trenchant

No. 482 Squadron was a maintenance unit of the Royal Australian Air Force (RAAF). It was formed in May 1942 as No. 4 Repair and Salvage Unit, renamed No. 4 Repair and Servicing Unit in January 1945 and re-formed as No. 482 (Maintenance) Squadron in May 1946. The squadron then became a component of No. 82 (Bomber) Wing at RAAF Station Amberley, Queensland. Over the years it serviced the wing's Consolidated B-24 Liberators, Avro Lincolns, English Electric Canberras, McDonnell Douglas F-4E Phantoms, and General Dynamics F-111Cs. No. 482 Squadron merged with No. 3 Aircraft Depot to form No. 501 Wing in March 1992. No. 501 Wing continued to provide maintenance and logistics support for the F-111Cs at Amberley until disbanding in 2001.

== History ==
No. 4 Repair and Salvage Unit (RSU) was formed at RAAF Station Laverton, Victoria, on 18 May 1942. Its inaugural commanding officer, from 1 June, was acting Flight Lieutenant H.R.P. Relf. On 20 October, it commenced a move to Pell Airfield, Northern Territory, becoming operational on 26 December. Coming under the control of North-Western Area Command (NWA), No. 4 RSU was responsible for salvaging damaged aircraft, which it subsequently repaired or dismantled for spare parts. By December 1943, its strength was over 500 officers and men. It was renamed No. 4 Repair and Servicing Unit on 1 January 1945, and re-located to Winnellie, Northern Territory, on 11 May. As the war in the Pacific moved northward, No. 4 RSU's strength was reduced; by August it was under 400, including 11 officers. On 15 December 1945, it moved to RAAF Station Parkes, New South Wales. The unit re-located from Parkes to RAAF Station Amberley, Queensland, on 15 April 1946.

No. 4 RSU re-formed as No. 482 (Maintenance) Squadron on 10 May 1946. Commanded by Squadron Leader J.E. Jackson, it became a component of No. 82 (Bomber) Wing. The squadron's motto was "Trenchant". No. 82 Wing's flying complement included Nos. 12, 21, and 23 Squadrons, but these were renumbered Nos. 1, 2 and 6 Squadrons respectively in February 1948. At the same time, the wing's Consolidated B-24 Liberator heavy bombers were replaced by Avro Lincolns. During 1949–50, some of the Lincolns were specially modified with advanced radar and other instrumentation to participate in Operation Cumulative, a joint program with the Royal Air Force gathering long-range navigation and bombing data for use in potential air campaigns against the Soviet Union. No. 482 Squadron faced a critical shortage of Merlin engines in mid-1950, but the situation improved the next year.

In October 1950, No. 482 Squadron personnel undertook airframe and Avon engine courses in preparation for the introduction of the recently ordered English Electric Canberra jet bomber, forty-eight of which began re-equipping No. 82 Wing's flying squadrons in December 1953. During the 1950s and 60s, No. 482 Squadron provided ground support for exercises involving the Canberras in Darwin and New Guinea, and for ceremonial occasions including several royal visits. In April 1968, No. 1 Operational Conversion Unit (OCU), responsible for converting aircrew to the Canberra, was made independent of No. 82 Wing to concentrate on providing crews for No. 2 Squadron, which was on active duty in the Vietnam War. Maintenance responsibilities for the Canberras then transferred from No. 482 Squadron to No. 1 OCU, along with relevant staff and equipment.

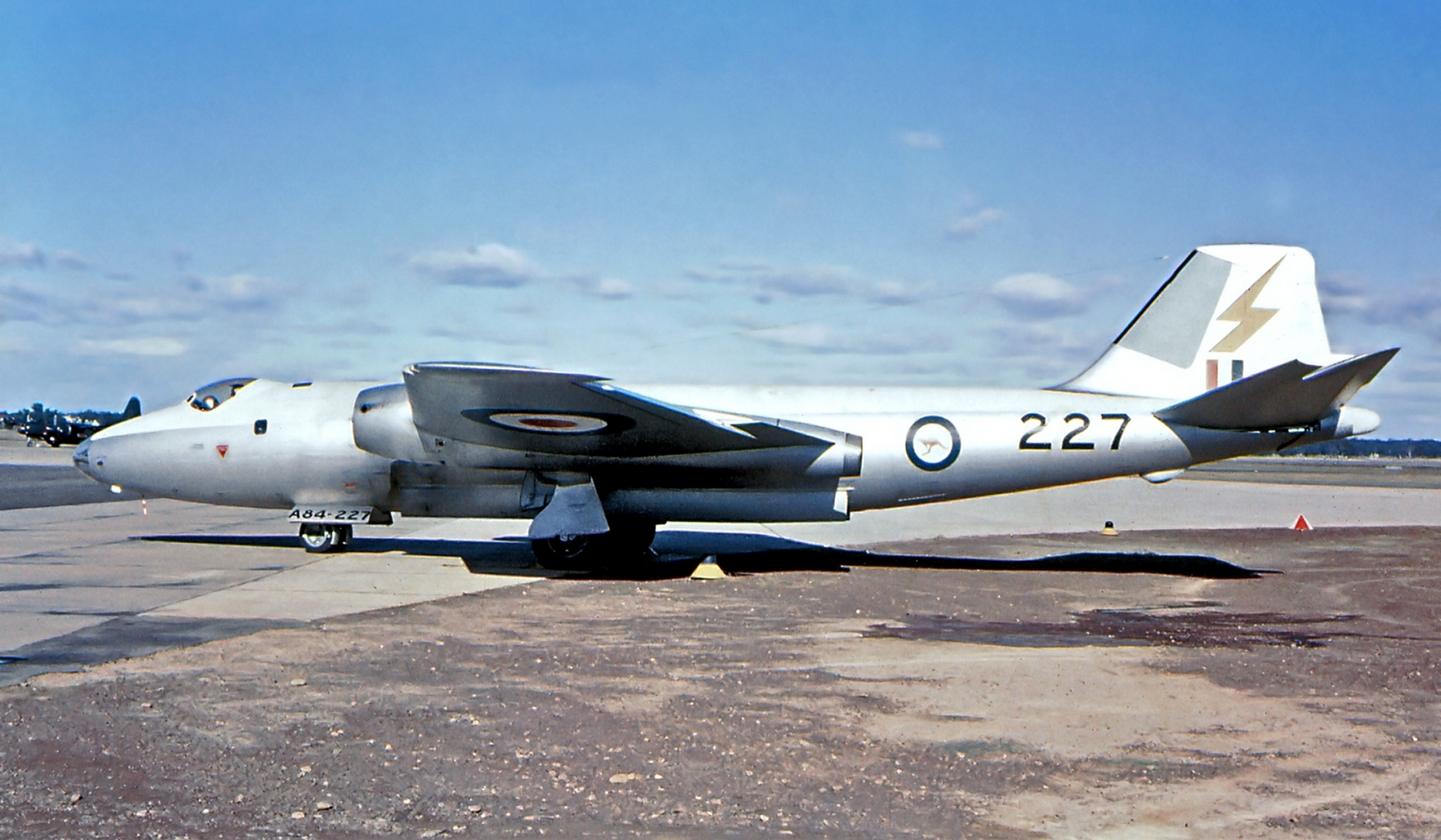
Canberra jet bomber, a type maintained by No. 482 Squadron from 1953 to 1968

Between 1970 and 1973, as an interim measure pending the long-delayed delivery of the General Dynamics F-111C swing-wing bomber, No. 82 Wing operated leased McDonnell Douglas F-4E Phantoms. They were maintained by No. 482 Squadron in conjunction with No. 3 Aircraft Depot; as well as routine servicing, the units modified the Phantoms' AN/APQ-120 radars during early 1971. No. 482 Squadron's hangar, electronics, and training facilities had been upgraded in the late 1960s in anticipation of the arrival of the F-111; the unit's main hangar became known as the "Taj Mahal". By 1973, the year the F-111 finally entered service, No. 482 Squadron had a strength of over 700. Borrowing a concept from the United States Air Force, the RAAF employed a centralised servicing regime, whereby all aircraft and maintenance personnel were held by No. 482 Squadron, which serviced and released the F-111s in line with Nos. 1 and 6 Squadrons' joint flying program. According to Air Marshal Errol McCormack, an F-111 pilot who rose to become Chief of the Air Staff, the system was a "disaster" that was doomed to failure owing to the relatively small size of the RAAF's F-111 fleet.

Responsibility for operational-level servicing of the F-111s was transferred to the flying squadrons on 1 February 1981. Under this arrangement, 200 personnel moved from No. 482 Squadron to Nos. 1 and 6 Squadrons, which for the first time took direct control of their F-111s. No. 482 Squadron continued to provide intermediate-level servicing for the bombers, while major upgrades and complex maintenance involving stripping down the airframe and engines were carried out by No. 3 Aircraft Depot. No. 482 Squadron also operated the F-111 flight simulator. The squadron's personnel deployed with the F-111s on exercises, and took part in investigations and recovery operations following accidents. On 17 March 1983, Sir Ninian Stephen presented No. 482 Squadron with the Governor-General's Banner. No. 482 Squadron merged with No. 3 Aircraft Depot to form No. 501 Wing on 16 March 1992. It became the largest unit in the RAAF, with a total strength of over 1,200. No. 501 Wing continued to provide deep maintenance and logistics support for the F-111s at Amberley until 2001, when Boeing Australia was awarded the maintenance contract.
