= No. 5 Flight RAAF =

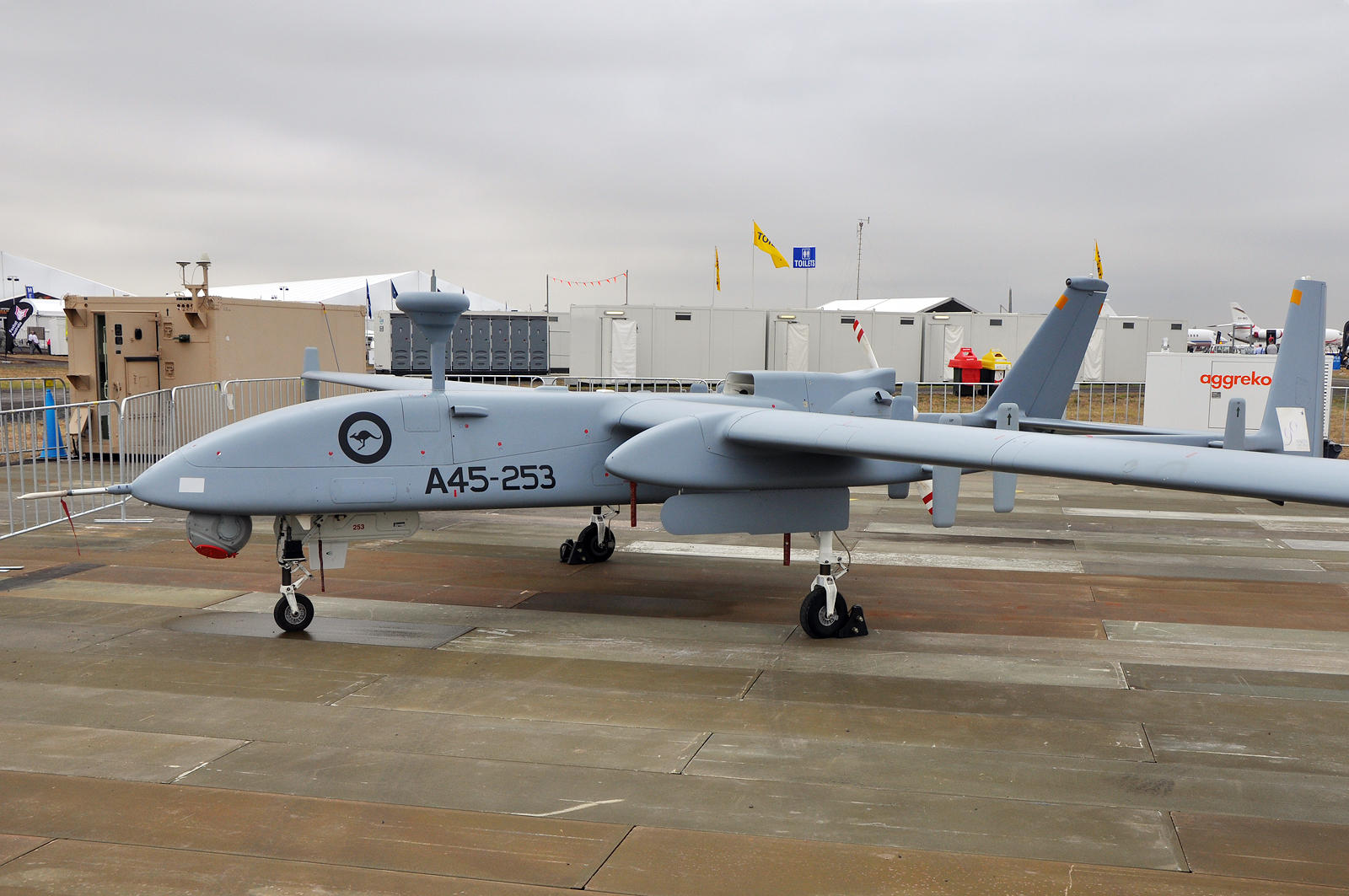
- One of No. 5 Flight's Herons on display in 2013
- Active: 2010–2017
- Country: Australia
- Branch: Royal Australian Air Force
- Role: Training
- Part of: No. 92 Wing RAAF
- Current base: RAAF Base Amberley
- Engagements: War in Afghanistan (2001–present)
- Decorations: Meritorious Unit Citation

Aircraft flown
- Reconnaissance: Heron RPA (2010–2017)

No. 5 Flight was a Royal Australian Air Force (RAAF) aircraft flight which was equipped with IAI Heron unmanned aerial vehicles. It was established in 2010 to operate Herons in Afghanistan. Following the withdrawal of the Heron detachment from that country in 2014, conducted training missions in Australia to maintain the RAAF's expertise in operating unmanned aerial vehicles until more advanced types are delivered. The Herons were retired in June 2017, and the flight was disbanded by the end of that year.

== History ==
No. 5 Flight was raised on 18 January 2010 at RAAF Base Amberley as part of No. 82 Wing. The flight's initial role was to operate the RAAF's small fleet of IAI Heron remotely piloted aircraft which were based at Kandahar in Afghanistan.

On 13 April 2013 the responsibility for Heron RPA transferred to the Royal Australian Air Force's Surveillance and Response Group. At this time the flight's responsibilities included training personnel from all branches of the Australian Defence Force to operate the Herons in Australia, and maintaining a detachment of personnel at Kandahar to operate the RPAs as part of Operation Slipper, Australia's contribution to the war in Afghanistan. The RAAF acquired a third Heron during 2011 which No. 5 Flight used to train RPA operators in Australia; prior to this time Heron operators were trained in Canada. The RAAF's Air Force newspaper reported in May 2011 that No. 5 Flight comprised a "handful of members". On 4 April 2013 the flight transferred to No. 92 Wing; at this time it had a strength of 18 full-time personnel and three reservists, and operated four Herons. Three of the UAVs were deployed to Afghanistan and the fourth was in Australia. As of 2013, most of No. 5 Flight's UAV operators had been fixed-wing aircraft pilots from the RAAF, Army and Navy.

After a further extension of their mission, the Heron detachment was scheduled to remain in Afghanistan until the end of 2014. It was announced in October 2014 that two Herons would be retained in Australia for a six-year period; at this time one of the UAVs was based at Woomera, South Australia and the other was to be transported from Afghanistan. It was planned for the two Herons to also operate from other Australian military and civilian airfields. The final Heron UAV detachment left Afghanistan in December 2014.

As of 2016, the main role of No. 5 Flight was to maintain the RAAF's expertise in operating UAVs until more capable types such as the Northrop Grumman MQ-4C Triton were delivered. No. 5 Flight was awarded the Meritorious Unit Citation in the Queen's birthday Honours on the 13 June 2016 for "sustained outstanding service in warlike operations through the provision of Intelligence, Surveillance and Reconnaissance capability on Operation Slipper, over the period January 2010 to November 2014."

No. 5 Flight's Herons were retired in June 2017, with the last flight of the type taking place from RAAF Base Tindal on 23 June. As of August 2017, No. 5 Flight was scheduled to be disbanded by the end of the year.

== See also ==
- No. 5 Squadron RAAF
