= Geoff Shepherd =

Australian RAAF Air Marshal (born 1952)

Geoffrey David Shepherd
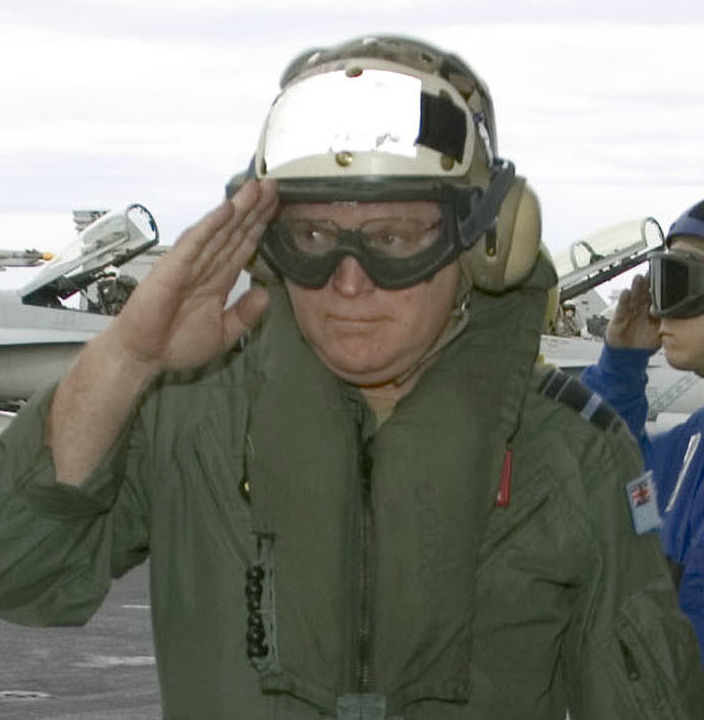
- Air Marshal Shepherd on board the USS Kitty Hawk, 2007
- Born: 24 January 1952 (age 74); Brisbane, Queensland
- Military career
- Allegiance: Australia
- Branch: Royal Australian Air Force
- Service years: 1971–2008
- Rank: Air Marshal
- Nickname: Shep
- Commands: Chief of Air Force (2005–08); RAAF Air Command (2003–05); No. 82 Wing (1995–98); No. 6 Squadron (1991–93)
- Awards: Officer of the Order of Australia; Commander of the Legion of Merit (United States); Meritorious Service Medal (Singapore); Commander of the National Order of Merit (France)

Air Marshal Geoffrey David Shepherd AO (born 24 January 1952) is a retired senior officer in the Royal Australian Air Force (RAAF), who served as Chief of Air Force from 2005 until 2008.

== Service history ==
Shepherd commenced his RAAF service with the 1971 RAAF Academy intake, graduating in December 1974 with a Bachelor of Science (Physics) degree from the University of Melbourne followed by a Postgraduate Diploma in Military Aviation.

He had operational flying tours on Mirage III fighter aircraft at RAAF Base Butterworth in Malaysia, the F-111 strike bomber at RAAF Base Amberley, both as a line pilot and as the Training Flight Commander and as a flying instructor at No 1 Flying Training School RAAF Base Point Cook. He has approximately 4500 flying hours, including 2500 hours in the F-111.

He has held staff appointments at 82 Wing (F-111) HQ, as the Assistant Defence Adviser at the Australian High Commission in Singapore, and in Force Development in the field of capability analysis. He also undertook staff training at the Joint Services Staff College.

His command appointments were Commanding Officer of No. 6 Squadron(F-111), in the rank of wing commander, and Officer Commanding No. 82 Wing (F-111) as a group captain.

He was promoted to air commodore on 1 December 1998 and served two years as the Chief of Staff at HQ Air Command. He was the Director General Operations at the Defence Signals Directorate from January 2001 until October 2002, when he moved on to become Director-General Joint Operations and Plans in Strategic Operations Division.

Air Commodore Shepherd was appointed a Member of the Order of Australia in the Australia Day 2000 Honours List.

He was promoted to air vice marshal on 2 December 2003 and appointed Air Commander Australia taking effect 15 December 2003.

On 23 May 2005, the Minister for Defence announced that, upon promotion to air marshal (as of 4 July 2005), Shepherd would succeed Angus Houston as the Chief of Air Force (CAF). In June 2006 he was elevated to Officer of the Order of Australia.

On 4 July 2008 his 37-year career in the RAAF came to an end with his retirement. His last official function was to be the Reviewing Officer of the Officer Training School Graduation Parade, held at RAAF Base East Sale, however due to unwanted weather conditions the Parade was cancelled. He was given one final stairway guard by the young men and women of the Australian Air Force Cadets, who were on a camp at RAAF Base East Sale at the time.

He was succeeded as CAF by Air Marshal Mark Binskin.

== Personal ==
Shepherd is known throughout the RAAF for calling out "Cooee", a distinctive Australian vocalisation used mainly in the outback, with which he ended his first address as Chief of Air Force.

He attended Brisbane State High School.

He is married to Anne, with whom he has two sons. His interests include gardening, rugby league football, travelling and understanding other cultures.

== Honours and awards ==

Officer of the Order of Australia (AO)	(2006)
Member of the Order of Australia (AM)	(2000)
Australian Service Medal	with SE ASIA clasp
Defence Force Service Medal with 4 clasps	35–39 years service
Australian Defence Medal	
Commander of the Legion of Merit (United States)	18 January 2007
Meritorious Service Medal (Singapore)	8 May 2007
Commander of the National Order of Merit (France)	2015

Military offices
Preceded by Air Marshal Angus Houston	Chief of Air Force; 2005–2008	Succeeded by Air Marshal Mark Binskin
Preceded by Air Vice Marshal John Kindler	Air Commander Australia; 2003–2005	Succeeded by Air Vice Marshal John Quaife
