= No. 82 Wing RAAF =

- No. 82 Wing's crest
- Active: 1944–current
- Country: Australia
- Branch: Royal Australian Air Force
- Role: Precision strike; reconnaissance
- Part of: Air Combat Group
- Headquarters: RAAF Base Amberley
- Mottos: Find and Destroy
- Engagements: World War II: South West Pacific theatre; North Western Area Campaign; Battle of Tarakan; Battle of North Borneo; Battle of Balikpapan

Commanders
- Notable commanders: Colin Hannah (1950–51); Charles Read (1957–60); Peter Raw (1965–66); Jake Newham (1973–74); Errol McCormack (1987–88); Geoff Shepherd (1995–98); Geoff Brown (2000–03); Leo Davies (2005–06)

Aircraft flown
- Attack: F/A-18F Super Hornet
- Electronic warfare: EA-18G Growler
- Reconnaissance: Pilatus PC-21

No. 82 Wing is the strike and reconnaissance wing of the Royal Australian Air Force (RAAF). It is headquartered at RAAF Base Amberley, Queensland. Coming under the control of Air Combat Group, the wing operates F/A-18F Super Hornet multirole fighters, EA-18G Growler electronic warfare aircraft, and Pilatus PC-21 forward air control aircraft. Its units include Nos. 1 and 6 Squadrons, operating the Super Hornet and Growler respectively, as well as No. 4 Squadron, operating the PC-21.

Formed in August 1944, No. 82 Wing operated B-24 Liberator heavy bombers in the South West Pacific theatre of World War II. Initially comprising two flying units, Nos. 21 and 24 Squadrons, the wing was augmented by 23 Squadron in 1945. After the war its operational units became Nos. 1, 2 and 6 Squadrons. It re-equipped with Avro Lincolns in 1948 and, from 1953, English Electric Canberra jets. Both types saw action in the Malayan Emergency during the 1950s; the Canberras were also deployed in the Vietnam War from 1967 to 1971.

Between 1970 and 1973, as a stop-gap pending delivery of the long-delayed General Dynamics F-111C swing-wing bomber, Nos. 1 and 6 Squadrons flew leased F-4E Phantoms. No. 2 Squadron continued to fly Canberras until it was disbanded in 1982. After taking delivery of their F-111Cs in 1973, Nos. 1 and 6 Squadrons operated the type for 37 years through numerous upgrades, augmented in the mid-1990s by ex-USAF G models. The forward air control unit joined No. 82 Wing in 2002. In 2010, the wing retired its F-111s and replaced them with Super Hornets as an interim force until the planned entry into Australian service of the F-35 Lightning II Joint Strike Fighter. Twelve Boeing EA-18G Growlers were procured to augment the Super Hornet fleet from 2017.

== History ==
=== World War II ===
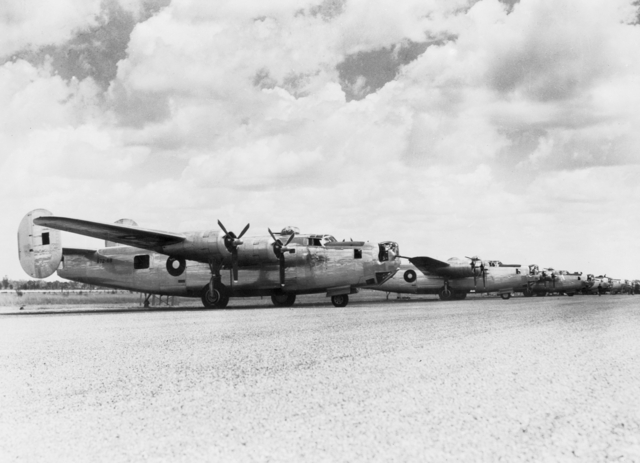
B-24 Liberators of No. 82 Wing at Fenton Airfield, Northern Territory, March 1945

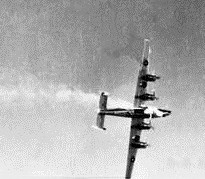
Liberator of No. 24 Squadron shot down by Japanese fighters during No. 82 Wing's attack on the cruiser Isuzu, April 1945; one crewman survived

No. 82 (Heavy Bomber) Wing—the RAAF's first such wing—was formed at Ballarat, Victoria, on 25 August 1944, under the command of Group Captain Deryck Kingwell. Comprising Nos. 21 and 24 Squadrons, both equipped with B-24 Liberators, the wing became operational on 11 January 1945. By this time it was headquartered in the Northern Territory, and came under the control of the RAAF's North-Western Area Command (NWA). Based at Fenton Airfield, the wing's aircraft sank seven Japanese ships in the Dutch East Indies during March.

On 6 April, all available Liberators joined B-25 Mitchells of No. 79 Wing in an assault on a Japanese convoy that included the cruiser Isuzu. Anti-aircraft fire from the cruiser and other ships, as well as attacks by enemy fighters, resulted in the loss of two Liberators, and the crews' standard of aerial gunnery was criticised afterwards. Allied submarines sank the damaged Isuzu the following day. Later that month, No. 23 Squadron, having recently converted to Liberators from A-31 Vengeances, was added to No. 82 Wing's strength. The wing's three flying squadrons identified themselves with black chevrons on the tail fins of their aircraft, No. 21's facing backwards, No. 23's downwards, and No. 24's forwards.

No. 82 Wing's Liberators played both a tactical and a strategic role in the Borneo Campaign, beginning with the lead-up to Operation Oboe One, the invasion of Tarakan on 1 May 1945. During that month a detachment relocated from Fenton to Morotai, attacking targets in Celebes and Balikpapan prior to Operation Oboe Six, the invasion of Labuan. In June, while the final Allied offensive of the Borneo Campaign got under way as Operation Oboe Two, the Battle of Balikpapan, the remainder of No. 82 Wing transferred from NWA to the command of the Australian First Tactical Air Force in Morotai. In the middle of the month the wing dropped 120 tons of bombs on Balikpapan's oil fields and surrounding areas, as well as coastal defence sites. During July it bombed targets at Celebes and Borneo, losing five Liberators for the month, including that of its new commanding officer, Group Captain Donald McLean. McLean died with most of his crew after being hit by anti-aircraft fire and ditching into the sea, a notoriously risky operation in the Liberator owing to the fuselage's tendency to break in two upon striking the water.

Just before the end of hostilities in the Pacific, the recently established garrison headquarters No. 11 Group unofficially directed the wing's operations. Following the Japanese surrender in September 1945, No. 82 Wing's Liberators were converted to transports and used to repatriate RAAF personnel from the South West Pacific. Over the course of its wartime existence, the wing's personnel numbered between 3,000 and 5,000, of whom more than half were ground crew. Along with its flying squadrons, its complement included No. 24 Air Stores Park, No. 6 Repair and Servicing Unit, and No. 30 Medical Clearing Station.

=== Cold War and after ===
Lincolns of No. 82 Wing over Amberley, 1954

No. 82 Wing moved to its present location at RAAF Base Amberley, Queensland, in 1946, where it came under the control of the RAAF's Eastern Area Command. In May that year, No. 482 (Maintenance) Squadron was formed from No. 4 Repair and Servicing Unit, to be responsible for repair and upkeep of the wing's aircraft. Its flying complement now included Nos. 12 (formerly of No. 85 Wing), 21, and 23 Squadrons, but these were renumbered Nos. 1, 2 and 6 Squadrons respectively in February 1948. At the same time, the wartime Liberators were replaced by Avro Lincoln heavy bombers. During 1949–50, some of the Lincolns were specially modified with advanced radar and other instrumentation to participate in Operation Cumulative, a joint program with the Royal Air Force gathering long-range navigation and bombing data for use in potential air campaigns against the Soviet Union.

Between 1950 and 1958—for the first two years under the control of No. 90 (Composite) Wing—the Lincolns of No. 1 Squadron were deployed for service in the Malayan Emergency, tasked with the prime responsibility for the Commonwealth's bombing campaign against Communist insurgents. This arrangement meant that No. 82 Wing's flying units were reduced to Nos. 2 and 6 Squadrons. From 1952 to 1957, the wing flew observation flights in connection with British atomic tests in Australia. No protective clothing was issued to air or ground crews during these flights and, following the second such operation in October 1953, nine of the twelve Lincolns involved were found to be contaminated, four so heavily that they were parked in a remote corner of the Amberley air base and never flown again. On 9 April 1953, the wing wrote off three Lincolns—without loss of life—in two separate incidents that collectively became known as "Black Thursday"; one of the Lincolns crashed on landing at Amberley during the day, and that night another Lincoln collided with one of its brethren at Cloncurry Aerodrome, Queensland.

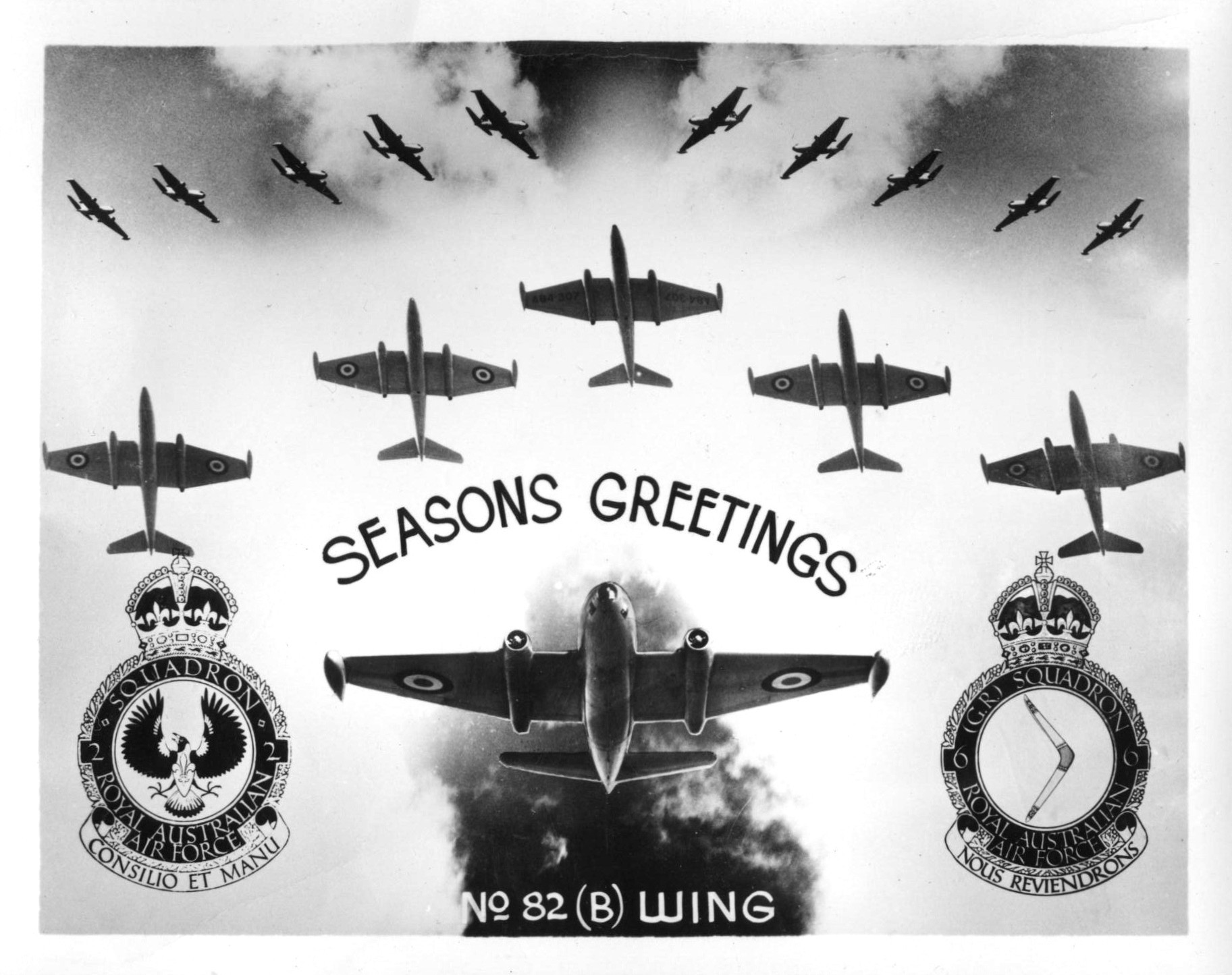
No. 82 Wing Christmas card featuring Canberras and the crests of Nos. 2 and 6 Squadrons, 1954

In December 1953, No. 82 Wing took delivery of the RAAF's first jet bomber, the Canberra Mk.20, 48 of which re-equipped the wing's three squadrons over the next five years. The new bombers were acquired partly for their capacity to deliver nuclear weapons, an ordnance option the RAAF seriously investigated but never implemented. Following the re-equipping of Nos. 2 and 6 Squadrons with the Canberra, a Lincoln Conversion Flight was formed in July 1955 under No. 82 Wing to provide training on the older bomber for crews preparing to deploy to Malaya for service with No. 1 Squadron; it disbanded in March 1956. Canberras from No. 2 Squadron relieved the Lincolns of No. 1 Squadron in Malaya during 1958. In January 1959, No. 1 (Bomber) Operational Conversion Unit (No. 1 OCU) was established at Amberley under the control of No. 82 Wing. Its role was to convert pilots and navigators to the Canberra, and train them for operations with the three bomber squadrons.

In 1964, No. 82 Wing's Canberras were slated for possible bombing and reconnaissance tasks against Indonesian forces under Operation Handover, a little-publicised contingency plan put into effect during the Indonesia–Malaysia Konfrontasi, although no combat ensued. No. 2 Squadron Canberras saw extensive action in the Vietnam War from 1967 to 1971, under the control of the USAF's 35th Tactical Fighter Wing. The Canberras flew almost 12,000 sorties and delivered over 76,000 pounds of bombs, for the loss of two aircraft to enemy action, and gained a high reputation for their accuracy. No. 1 OCU was made independent of No. 82 Wing in April 1968; its sole purpose from then until its disbandment in June 1971 was to supply trained crews to No. 2 Squadron in Vietnam. Nos. 1 and 6 Squadrons effectively ceased operations in 1968, while their crews underwent conversion to the General Dynamics F-111C swing-wing bomber, which was expected to enter service soon afterwards. Between 1970 and 1973, as an interim measure pending the delayed delivery of the F-111, Nos. 1 and 6 Squadrons flew leased F-4E Phantoms; meanwhile No. 2 Squadron continued to operate the Canberra, mainly for aerial survey work in Australia and Indonesia, until disbanding in 1982. The Air Force retained the option to purchase the Phantoms if the F-111C program was cancelled. Though not as sophisticated an aircraft as the F-111, the Phantom was a significant advance over the Canberra, and was highly regarded by its RAAF crews.

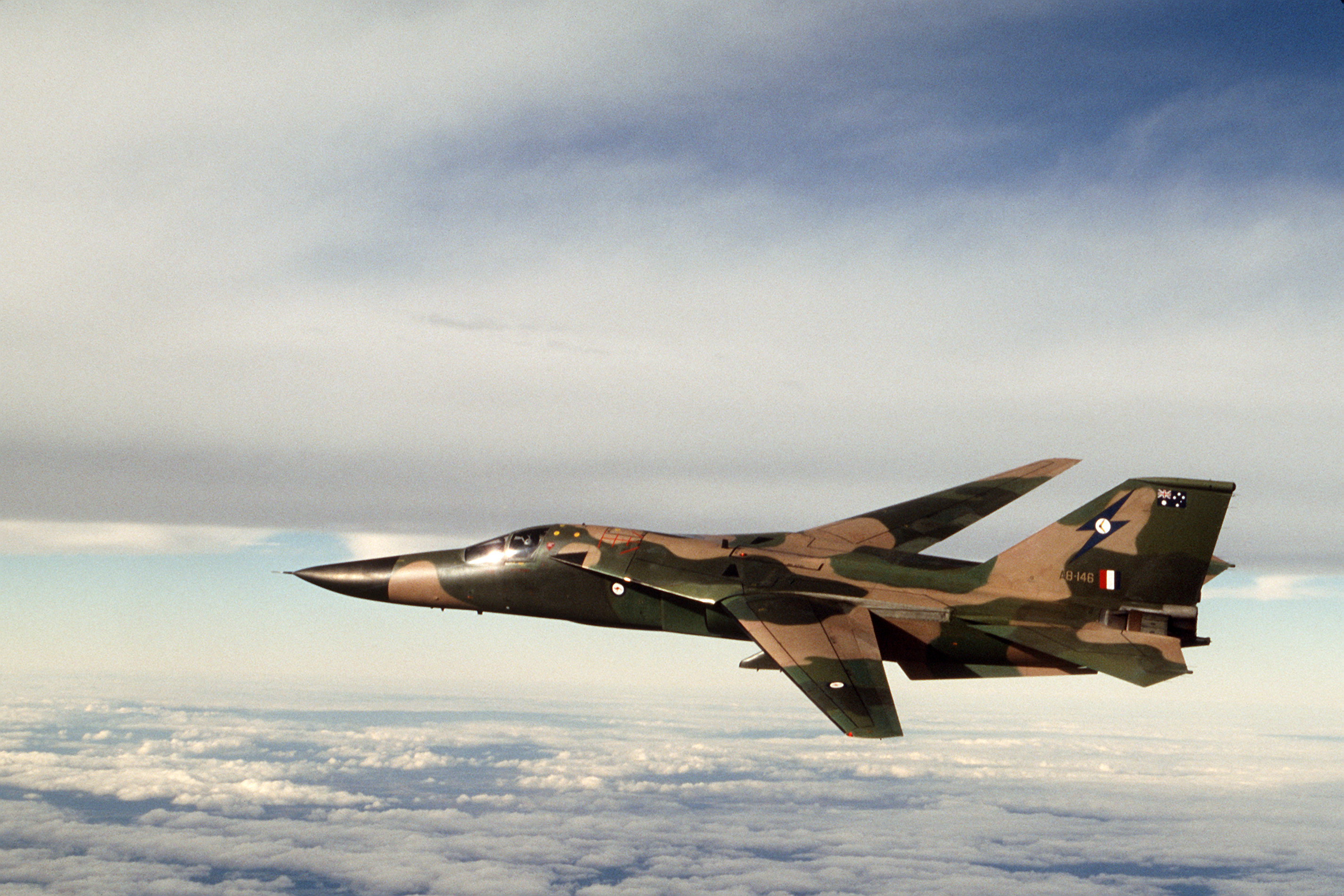
F-111C, the wing's mainstay from 1973 to 2010

On 1 June 1973, the Officer Commanding No. 82 Wing, Group Captain Jake Newham, led the first F-111Cs in to land at Amberley, a gala occasion attended by the Deputy Prime Minister and Minister for Defence, Lance Barnard, the Chief of the Air Staff, Air Marshal Charles Read, the Air Officer Commanding Operational Command, Air Vice Marshal Brian Eaton, and a large media contingent. Read ordered Newham to operate the F-111 with great caution initially, well within limits, lest the controversial aircraft suffer greater damage to its reputation through early attrition. Over its 37-year career with No. 82 Wing, the F-111 underwent numerous upgrades, including the Pave Tack infra-red and laser-guided precision weapons targeting system, Harpoon anti-shipping missiles, and advanced digital avionics. Roles within the wing were demarcated such that No. 1 Squadron was the lead strike unit, while No. 6 Squadron was primarily tasked with crew conversion training; No. 6 Squadron was also responsible for reconnaissance missions using specially modified RF-111Cs until these aircraft were transferred to No. 1 Squadron in 1996, and flew leased Learjets for survey work in 1982–87.

During 1982–83, four F-111s from the RAAF's original order that had been lost through accidents were replaced by four F-111As upgraded to C models. In 1992 an order was placed to augment the F-111C force with fifteen ex-USAF G models, to be operated by No. 6 Squadron. No. 82 Wing was awarded the Duke of Gloucester Cup as most proficient RAAF unit of 1994, in part for its success in introducing the F-111G with minimal additional staff. Alan Stephens, in the official history of the post-war Air Force, described the F-111 as "the region's pre-eminent strike aircraft" and the RAAF's most important acquisition. The closest the bombers came to being used in anger, however, was during the Australian-led INTERFET intervention into East Timor in September 1999. Both F-111 squadrons were deployed to RAAF Base Tindal, Northern Territory, to support the international forces, and remained there until December. From 20 September, when INTERFET began to arrive in East Timor, the aircraft were maintained at a high level of readiness to conduct reconnaissance flights or air strikes if the situation deteriorated. As it happened, INTERFET did not encounter significant resistance, and F-111 operations were limited to reconnaissance by the RF-111Cs from 5 November through 9 December.

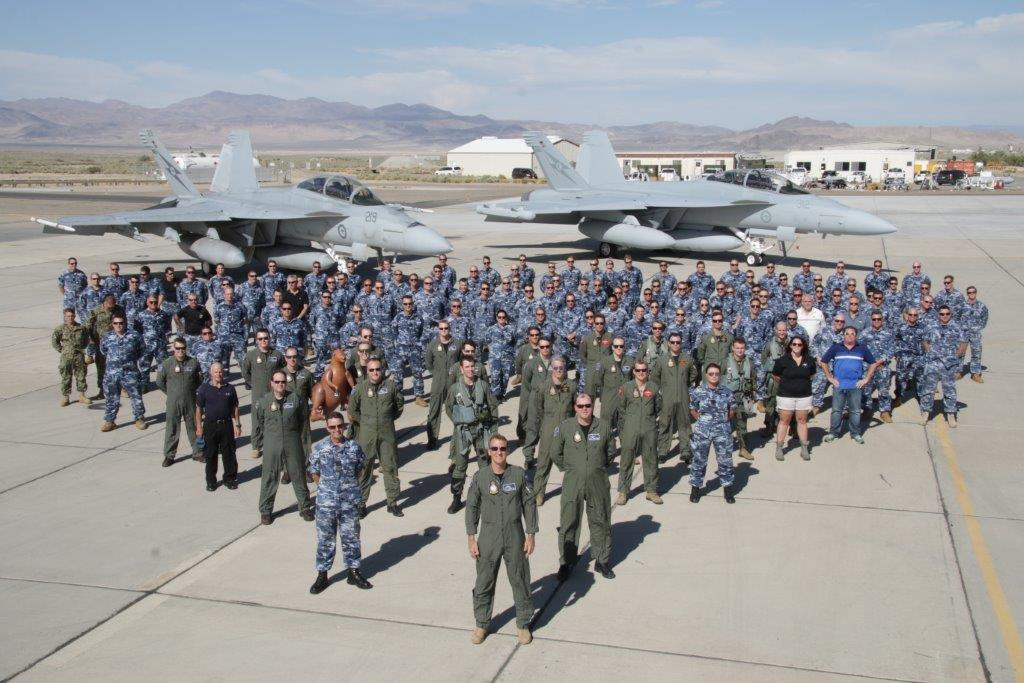
Personnel from No. 1 and No. 6 Squadrons posing with an F/A-18F and an EA-18G in 2017

No. 482 Squadron merged with Amberley's No. 3 Aircraft Depot to form No. 501 Wing in March 1992. The squadron completed its disbandment in June that year. In 1998 the RAAF became the only air force operating the F-111, after the USAF retired the type. From 2001, Boeing Australia performed all F-111 maintenance under contract. In February 2002, No. 82 Wing came under the control of the newly established Air Combat Group (ACG), formed by merging Tactical Fighter Group (TFG) and Strike Reconnaissance Group (SRG). The reorganisation altered the wing's responsibilities, as it transferred lead-in training for the F-111s to No. 78 Wing at RAAF Base Williamtown, New South Wales, and put No. 82 Wing in charge of the strike capability of No. 81 Wing's F/A-18 Hornet fighters, also based at Williamtown. No. 82 Wing's role was reiterated as "precision strike and reconnaissance"; the Forward Air Control Development Unit (FACDU), flying Pilatus PC-9s, was added to its strength. The merger of TFG and SRG was designed to position the Air Force to replace both the F-111 and the F/A-18 with a single Joint Strike Fighter (JSF).

In 2007, the Australian government decided to retire all of the F-111s by 2010, and acquire 24 F/A-18F Super Hornets as an interim replacement, pending the arrival of the F-35 Lightning II JSF then under development. The F-111 fleet was considered to be at risk owing to fatigue issues, and too expensive to operate as each aircraft required 180 hours of maintenance for every hour of flying time. No. 82 Wing began re-equipping with the Super Hornet in 2010, and the last F-111s were retired on 3 December that year. FACDU was combined with the RAAF Special Tactics Project in July 2009 to form No. 4 Squadron. The following year, No. 82 Wing became home to No. 5 Flight, which was responsible for training personnel to operate the RAAF's two IAI Heron unmanned aerial vehicles based at Kandahar in Afghanistan. The Air Force acquired a third Heron in 2011, based in Australia and operated by No. 5 Flight. As of that year, the F-35 was not expected to enter Australian service until 2018. The RAAF hoped to be able to sell off its Super Hornets "with very low kilometres on the clock" by 2020, but this would depend on delivery of the replacement F-35s. In April 2013, No. 5 Flight was transferred from No. 82 Wing to Surveillance and Response Group's No. 92 Wing. The following month, the Federal government announced plans to purchase twelve Boeing EA-18G Growlers to supplement the Super Hornet fleet.

On 7 July 2017, the RAAF completed delivery of the 12 EA-18G Growlers with the arrival of the last Growler at RAAF Base Amberley, home of No. 6 Squadron. All Super Hornets were transferred to No. 1 Squadron.

In June 2020 No. 82 Wing Training Flight RAAF was established as part of a two year trial of returning Super Hornet training to Australia from the United States. The unit was equipped with six F/A-18Fs transferred from No. 1 Squadron.
