= Lincoln Conversion Flight RAAF =

Lincoln Conversion Flight
- Active: 1955–1956
- Country: Australia
- Branch: Royal Australian Air Force
- Role: Operational conversion training
- Part of: No. 82 Wing

Aircraft flown
- Bomber: Avro Lincoln

Lincoln Conversion Flight was a Royal Australian Air Force (RAAF) training unit. The flight was formed in July 1955 to provide operational conversion training on the Avro Lincoln heavy bomber and was disbanded in March the next year.

== History ==
The Lincoln Conversion Flight was formed at RAAF Base Amberley on 11 July 1955. The flight was established to train new aircrew to operate the Lincoln bomber when the previous Lincoln operational conversion unit, No. 6 Squadron, transitioned to the Canberra bomber. All of No. 6 Squadron's Lincoln crews were transferred to the Lincoln Conversion Flight, and the squadron was re-manned by crews posted from No. 2 Squadron. Lincoln Conversion Flight formed part of No. 82 Wing, which was also based at Amberley.

The flight continued No. 6 Squadron's mission of providing trained aircrew to No. 1 Squadron. This squadron was equipped with Lincolns and deployed to Malaya where it was operating against Communist forces in the Malayan Emergency. The Lincoln Conversion Flight began to provide training as soon as it was formed. In addition to providing aircrew with experience in navigation, gunnery and bombing, formation flying and Army co-operation, the flight also ferried Lincolns between Australia and Malaya and undertook search and rescue tasks. In addition, the unit occasionally dropped supplies to Army units during exercises and flew national service personnel to Darwin in October 1955 to support one of No. 6 Squadron's training exercises. On 22 and 24 January 1956 two Lincoln Conversion Flight aircraft dropped supplies to flood affected areas near Goondiwindi in Queensland. Further flood relief sorties were conducted on 11 February and between the 20th and 22nd of the month.

The Lincoln Conversion Flight was disbanded on 26 March 1956.
