= Forward Air Control Development Unit RAAF =

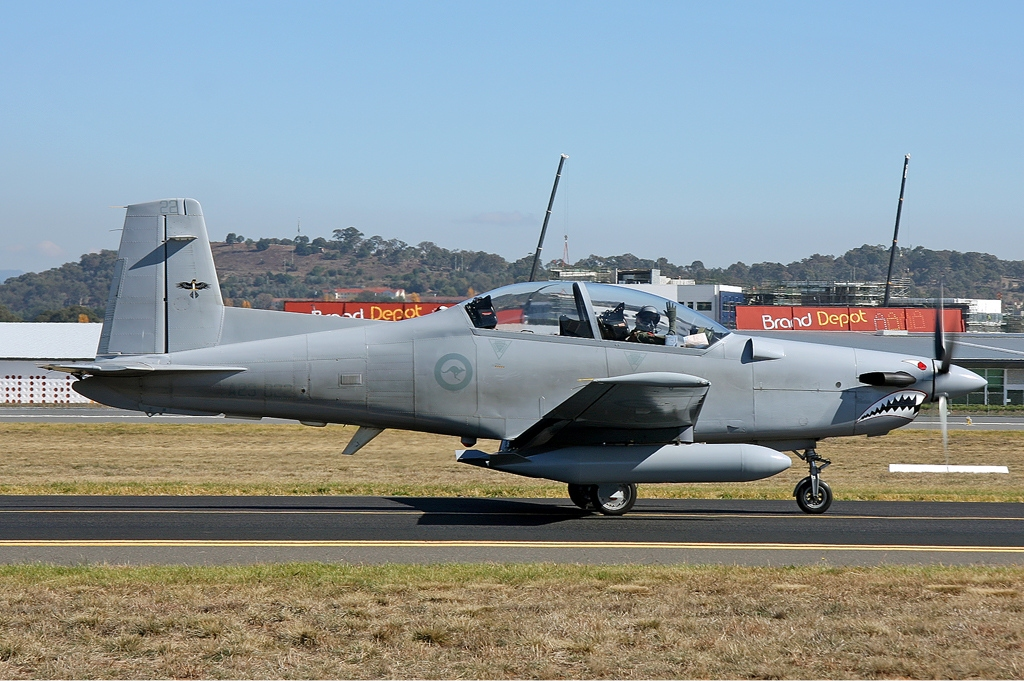
- A FACDU Pilatus PC-9/A at Canberra Airport in 2008
- Active: 2002–2009
- Country: Australia
- Branch: Royal Australian Air Force
- Role: Training
- Part of: No. 82 Wing
- Base: RAAF Base Williamtown

Aircraft flown
- Trainer: PC-9

The Forward Air Control Development Unit (FACDU) was a Royal Australian Air Force unit tasked with providing training in forward air control to RAAF pilots. It was formed in 2002 from No. 76 Squadron's C Flight and was merged with the RAAF Special Tactics Project on 3 July 2009 to form No. 4 Squadron.
