= Pell Airfield =

Former airport in Adelaide River, Northern Territory, Australia

- IATA: none; ICAO: none

Summary
- Location: Adelaide River, Northern Territory
- Coordinates: 13°08′49″S 131°06′25″E

Map
- Location of airport in Northern Territory

Pell Airfield was an airfield in the Northern Territory of Australia located southeast of Batchelor Airfield near the Stuart Highway in what is now the locality of Adelaide River and which was in use during World War II.

== History ==
The airfield was constructed in 1942 as an aircraft salvage, repair and servicing facility. The airfield was named in honour of Major Floyd J Pell, a United States pilot, who was killed during the first Japanese attack on Darwin on 19 February 1942.

The airfield was abandoned shortly after 1945.

The following parts of the airfield were listed together as one entry on the Northern Territory Heritage Register on 26 September 2007 – WWII Pell Airfield 4RSU RAAF Engineering Workshop and Main Camp.

== List of Japanese bombing raids against Pell Airfield ==
- 24 October 1942 (04:52 am)
- 21 August 1943 (03:30 am)

== List of units based at Pell Airfield ==
- No. 4 Repair and Salvage Unit RAAF

== See also ==
- List of airports in the Northern Territory
