= No. 4 Squadron RAAF =

Royal Australian Air Force squadron

- No. 4 Squadron's crest
- Active: 1916–1919; 1937–1939; 1940–1948; 2009–current
- Country: Australia
- Branch: Royal Australian Air Force
- Role: Forward air control Forward air control training Joint Terminal Attack Controller; Special operations
- Part of: No. 82 Wing
- Base: RAAF Base Williamtown
- Motto: "Cooperate to Strike"
- Engagements: World War I World War II; War in Afghanistan

Aircraft flown
- Fighter: Sopwith Camel; Sopwith Snipe; Hawker Demon; CAC Wirraway; CAC Boomerang; P-40 Kittyhawk; CAC Mustang
- Reconnaissance: Auster AOP III
- Trainer: De Havilland Moth Minor; Avro Anson; Pilatus PC-9; Pilatus PC-21

No. 4 Squadron is a Royal Australian Air Force squadron composed of the air force special forces Combat Controllers, aircrew who operate the Pilatus PC-21 aircraft and instructors for the Australian Defence Force Joint Terminal Attack Controller (JTAC) course.

The squadron was previously a fighter and army co-operation unit active in both World War I and World War II. Formed in late 1917, the squadron operated on the Western Front as part of the Australian Flying Corps until the armistice in November 1918. It was disbanded after the war in mid-1919, but re-raised in 1937 and 1940. In 1942 it deployed to New Guinea, where it supported military forces by spotting for artillery and providing reconnaissance and close air support. As the war progressed, the squadron took part in the Huon Peninsula, New Britain and Borneo campaigns. It was disbanded in early 1948, but was re-formed on 2 July 2009 to provide training to forward air controllers and to support Army Special Operations Command.

== Composition ==
No. 4 Squadron consists of three flights designated as A, B and C as well as maintenance / logistics sections and a small administrative team.

=== A Flight ===
A Flight is composed of aircrew responsible for operating four Pilatus PC-21(F) Forward Air Control (FAC) variant aircraft. The PC-21 in grey paintwork differs in appearance from the standard multi-coloured RAAF PC-21. The aircraft are based at RAAF Base Williamtown to train ADF Joint Terminal Attack Controllers (JTAC).

=== B Flight: Combat Control Team (CCT) ===
B Flight is the Combat Control Team (CCT), composed of Combat Controllers responsible for reconnaissance, joint terminal attack control and advanced force operations, doing so either as part of a larger advanced force (supporting the SASR or Commandos from the 1st or 2nd Commando Regiment), or independently. Combat Controllers provide a range of capabilities, including Forward Air Control of Offensive Air Support, Landing Zone Reconnaissance, Aviation Meteorology Observation and Airspace Management.

The Special Tactics Project was formed in 2007 to train air force personnel as Combat Controllers similar to US Air Force combat controllers, following a request by the Army Special Operations Command in 2006. Between 2008 and 2009, three intakes completed initial training and four members deployed during combat operations in Afghanistan with the Special Operations Task Group (SOTG). Combat Controllers served continuously with the SOTG from 2008 rotating controllers at each SOTG rotation until withdrawal. In July 2009, the Special Tactics Project became B Flight in the reformed No. 4 Squadron.

Selection to become a Combat Controller is open to any ADF member and involves completion of the 8-week CCT Intake Course providing preparatory ground skills training and to prepare volunteers for the Special Forces Entry Test. Volunteers need to pass the Special Forces Entry Test, complete the Commando Reinforcement Training Cycle, Joint Terminal Attack Controller, Aviation Meteorology, Assault Zone Reconnaissance and Air Weapons Delivery courses. After passing selection and completing nearly two years of training, the Combat Controller is issued with a grey beret featuring a Sykes-Fairbain (commando) dagger.

=== C Flight ===
C Flight delivers the ADF Joint Terminal Attack Controller (JTAC) course as well as the ongoing accreditation of graduates. In 2005, the Air Force became the first foreign air force to receive Joint Terminal Attack Controller (JTAC) accreditation from the United States Joint Forces Command (USJFCOM). The six-week JTAC course teaches planning, briefing, controlling and reporting of close air support (CAS). The JTAC course is conducted twice a year, with the aim of graduating 32 students a year. More than 300 students have graduated since 1997.

== History ==
=== World War I ===
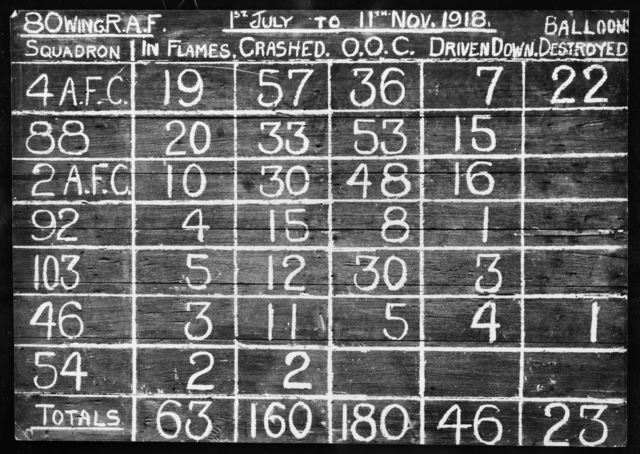
France, November 1918. A scoreboard of aerial victories claimed by No. 80 Wing RAF from July to November 1918. The units listed are: No. 4 Squadron AFC, No. 88 Squadron RAF, No. 2 Squadron AFC, and Nos. 92, 103, 46 and 54 Squadrons RAF.

No. 4 Squadron was established as a unit of the Australian Flying Corps (AFC) at Point Cook, Victoria, on 16 October 1916. According to the unit war diary, Captain Andrew Lang took command of the squadron and its initial complement of one officer and 26 men on 25 October. Shortly after its formation the squadron departed for Britain, arriving at Castle Bromwich for further training in March 1917.

The unit arrived in France on 18 December 1917. During its time on the Western Front, it was assigned to No. 80 Wing. Operating Sopwith Camels and Snipes, it performed fighter sweeps, provided air support for the army, and raided German airstrips. No. 4 Squadron claimed more "kills" than any other AFC unit: 199 enemy aircraft destroyed. In addition, 33 enemy balloons were destroyed or driven down.

Members of the unit included Captain Harry Cobby, the AFC's leading ace of the war, credited with destroying 29 aircraft and observation balloons, and Captain George Jones, who shot down seven aircraft and later served as the RAAF's Chief of the Air Staff for ten years. Aces Roy King, Edgar McCloughry, Herbert Watson, Thomas Baker, Leonard Taplin, Thomas Barkell, Arthur Palliser, Norman Trescowthick, Garnet Malley and Albert Robertson also served in the squadron.

Following the armistice, No. 4 Squadron remained in Europe and was based in Cologne, Germany, as part of the British Army of Occupation. It returned to Australia in March 1919 and was disbanded in Melbourne in June.

=== World War II ===
No. 4 Squadron was re-formed as a general reconnaissance unit at RAAF Station Richmond, New South Wales, on 3 May 1937, flying Hawker Demons before taking delivery of its first Avro Anson the following month. Re-numbered No. 6 (General Reconnaissance) Squadron on 1 March 1939, No. 4 Squadron was re-formed again at Richmond on 17 June 1940, this time as an army co-operation unit. Originally equipped with Demons and De Havilland Moths, it converted to CAC Wirraways in September and relocated to Canberra later that month. On 20 May 1942, No. 4 Squadron deployed to Camden Airfield, where it flew anti-submarine patrols as well as army co-operation training sorties until redeploying to Queensland and then in November to New Guinea.

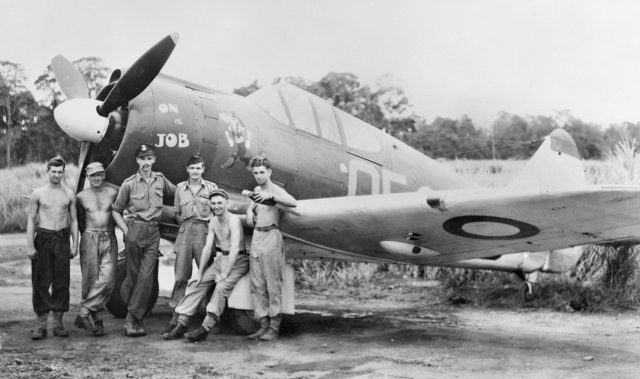
No. 4 Squadron Boomerang fighter and ground crew in New Guinea, October 1943

The squadron's initial task in New Guinea was to support the American and Australian forces in the Battle of Buna-Gona. Until the end of the war the squadron operated in the army co-operation role, providing ground forces with artillery observation, reconnaissance and close air support. On 26 December 1942, a No. 4 Squadron Wirraway piloted by Pilot Officer John Archer shot down an A6M Zero. This was the only kill achieved by a Wirraway during the war and earned Archer the US Silver Star. On 31 January 1943, the squadron sent one of its flights to Wau, where it participated in the Battle of Wau.

In May 1943, No. 4 Squadron was re-equipped with CAC Boomerang fighter aircraft, to be operated in a tactical reconnaissance role. Operating with these new aircraft and also some Wirraways it had retained, the squadron supported the Australian 7th and 9th Divisions during the Huon Peninsula campaign. It also operated six Piper Cubs as liaison aircraft during these campaigns. The squadron continued to support Australian, US Army and US Marine Corps units in New Guinea and New Britain until March 1945 when it deployed to Morotai and then to the island of Labuan to support Australian ground forces in the Borneo campaign. It supported the 9th Division's campaign in North Borneo and the 7th Division's landing at Balikpapan. Casualties during the war amounted to 37 personnel killed.

=== Post-war years ===
After the war, No. 4 Squadron returned to Australia on 14 November 1945 and was again based at Canberra. It re-equipped with late-model P-40 Kittyhawks, having received a few of these aircraft while in Borneo, and this was followed by CAC Mustangs and Austers in early 1947. After completing training on its new aircraft, the squadron provided a firepower demonstration for cadets of the Royal Military College, Duntroon, during an exercise at Braidwood in September 1947. On 7 March 1948, No. 4 Squadron ceased to exist, having been re-numbered No. 3 Squadron.

No. 4 Squadron was re-formed on 3 July 2009 at RAAF Base Williamtown to train forward air controllers. The Forward Air Control Development Unit (FACDU) of No. 82 Wing, which operated Pilatus PC-9/As, was merged into the new unit, along with the Special Tactics Project. This continued the FAC presence at Williamtown that had been maintained by FACDU and No. 4 Flight, which operated Winjeels out of Williamtown from 1970 to 1989. No. 4 Squadron's Pilatus PC-9/As were replaced with four Pilatus PC-21s in 2020.

== Aircraft operated ==
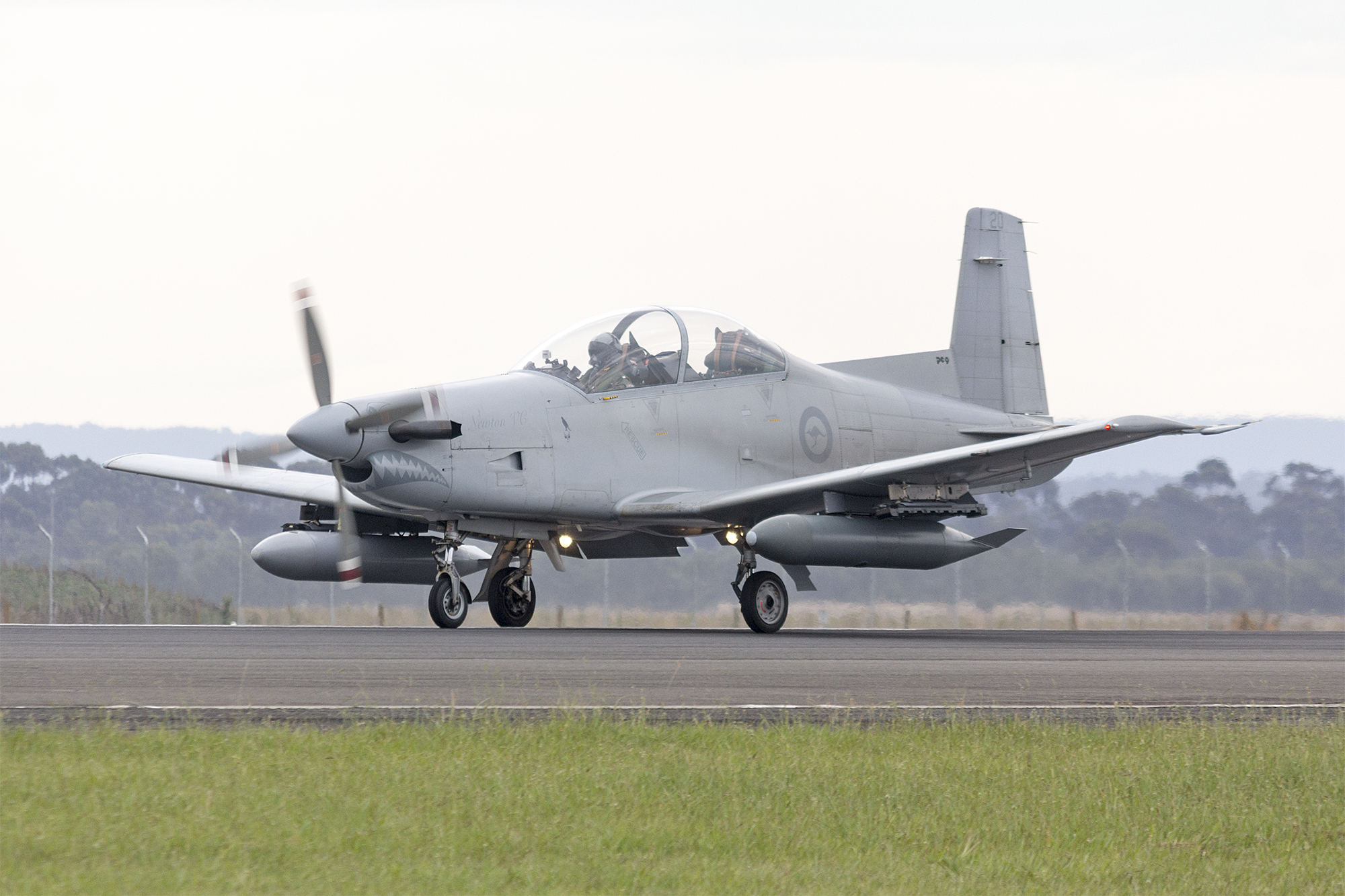
A No. 4 Squadron Pilatus PC-9/A in 2015

No. 4 Squadron has operated the following aircraft:

- Sopwith Camel (1917–1918)
- Sopwith Snipe (1918–1919)
- Hawker Demon (1937 and 1940)
- Avro Anson (1937–1939)
- de Havilland Moth Minor (1940–1941)
- CAC Wirraway (1940–1945)
- de Havilland Tiger Moth (1942–?)
- CAC Boomerang (1943–1945)
- Piper Cub (1943–1944)
- Curtiss P-40 Kittyhawk (1945–1947)
- CAC Mustang (1947–1948)
- Auster AOP III (1947–1948)
- Pilatus PC-9 (2009–2019)
- Pilatus PC-21 (2020–current)
