= No. 3 Aircraft Depot RAAF =

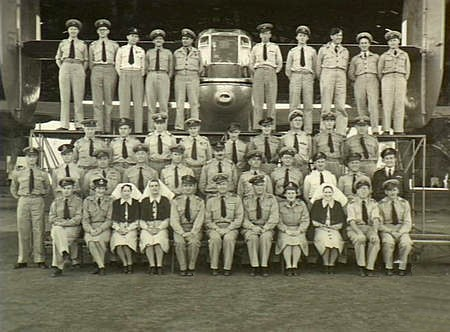
- Group Captain G.E. Douglas (front row, centre) with officers and a B-24 Liberator of No. 3 Aircraft Depot, July 1945
- Active: 1942–92
- Allegiance: Australia
- Branch: Royal Australian Air Force
- Role: Aircraft maintenance
- Garrison/HQ: RAAF Base Amberley
- Motto(s): Excel

Commanders
- Notable commanders: James Rowland (1966–69)

No. 3 Aircraft Depot (No. 3 AD) was a maintenance unit of the Royal Australian Air Force (RAAF). Formed in March 1942 at RAAF Station Amberley, Queensland, its prime function initially was the assembly and despatch of combat aircraft from the United States; it also performed salvage operations. From 1942 until 1947 it took on the role of administering the Amberley base. The depot was responsible for heavy maintenance of the RAAF's English Electric Canberra jet bombers following their entry into service in 1953. In the 1970s it began maintaining and upgrading the General Dynamics F-111C swing-wing bomber, along with Bell UH-1 Iroquois and Boeing CH-47 Chinook helicopters. No. 3 AD merged with No. 482 Maintenance Squadron in March 1992 to form No. 501 Wing, which maintained the F-111 until disbanding in 2001.

== History ==
=== World War II ===
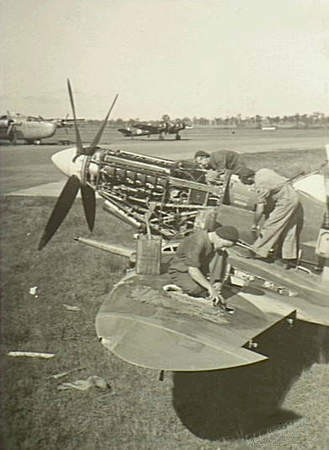
No. 3 AD personnel at work on a Supermarine Spitfire Mk VIII, July 1945

No. 3 Aircraft Depot (No. 3 AD) was formed at RAAF Station Amberley, Queensland, on 16 March 1942. It came under the control of No. 5 (Maintenance) Group. The depot's first, temporary, commanding officer was Squadron Leader W.H. Nicholson. On establishment, No. 3 AD's main purpose was the assembly and despatch of combat aircraft manufactured in the United States. In its first six weeks of operation, it assembled 123 Bell P-39 Airacobra fighters and a dozen Martin B-26 Marauder medium bombers. The depot was also responsible for the inspection of RAAF CAC Wirraways and Lockheed Hudsons. A further role was salvaging damaged aircraft from units in the local area, and despatching them to No. 5 Aircraft Depot at RAAF Station Wagga, New South Wales, for repair.

Wing Commander (later Group Captain) G.E. Douglas, previously in charge of No. 1 Aircraft Depot at Laverton, Victoria, assumed command of No. 3 AD in June 1942. Station Headquarters Amberley was dissolved on 1 July, and the depot took over the role of command and control of the base. As the war progressed, Amberley became one of Australia's largest aircraft maintenance facilities, as well as a way station for United States Army Air Forces personnel and equipment bound for operations in the South West Pacific. In addition to Airacobras and Marauders, among the aircraft types No. 3 AD assembled during World War II were Curtiss P-40 Kittyhawks, Republic P-43 Lancers, Vultee A-31 Vengeances, Supermarine Spitfires, Grumman F6F Hellcats, and North American P-51 Mustangs.

=== Post-war years ===
No. 82 (Heavy Bomber) Wing and its three squadrons of Consolidated B-24 Liberators arrived at Amberley as lodger units between February and April 1946. In the aftermath of World War II, No. 3 AD continued to command and administer the base until the re-establishment of Station Headquarters Amberley in 1947. No. 82 Wing converted to Avro Lincolns during 1948. In October 1952, when Lincolns flew observation flights as part of Operation Hurricane, the first British atomic test in Australia, No. 3 AD was responsible for handling underwing canisters used to collect radioactive particles. The RAAF's first jet bomber, the English Electric Canberra, began replacing the Lincoln in December 1953. No. 3 AD was responsible for "deep" maintenance of the Canberra, which involved stripping aircraft back to their components. This process was generally required every five years, and could take up to a year to complete. The depot also performed deep maintenance on the CAC Sabre fighter during its service with the RAAF. No. 3 AD's crest was approved by Queen Elizabeth II in June 1959; the design featured a Maltese cross in azure, symbolising the unit's home state of Queensland, surmounted by a cock's head in gold with a red comb. From December 1966 until January 1969, No. 3 AD was commanded by Group Captain James Rowland, later Chief of the Air Staff and Governor of New South Wales. By the 1970s, the depot was responsible for maintenance of the RAAF's Bell UH-1 Iroquois helicopters as well as the Canberra bombers. It also maintained the McDonnell Douglas F-4E Phantoms leased to the RAAF from 1970 to 1973 as an interim strike force pending delivery of the long-delayed General Dynamics F-111C.

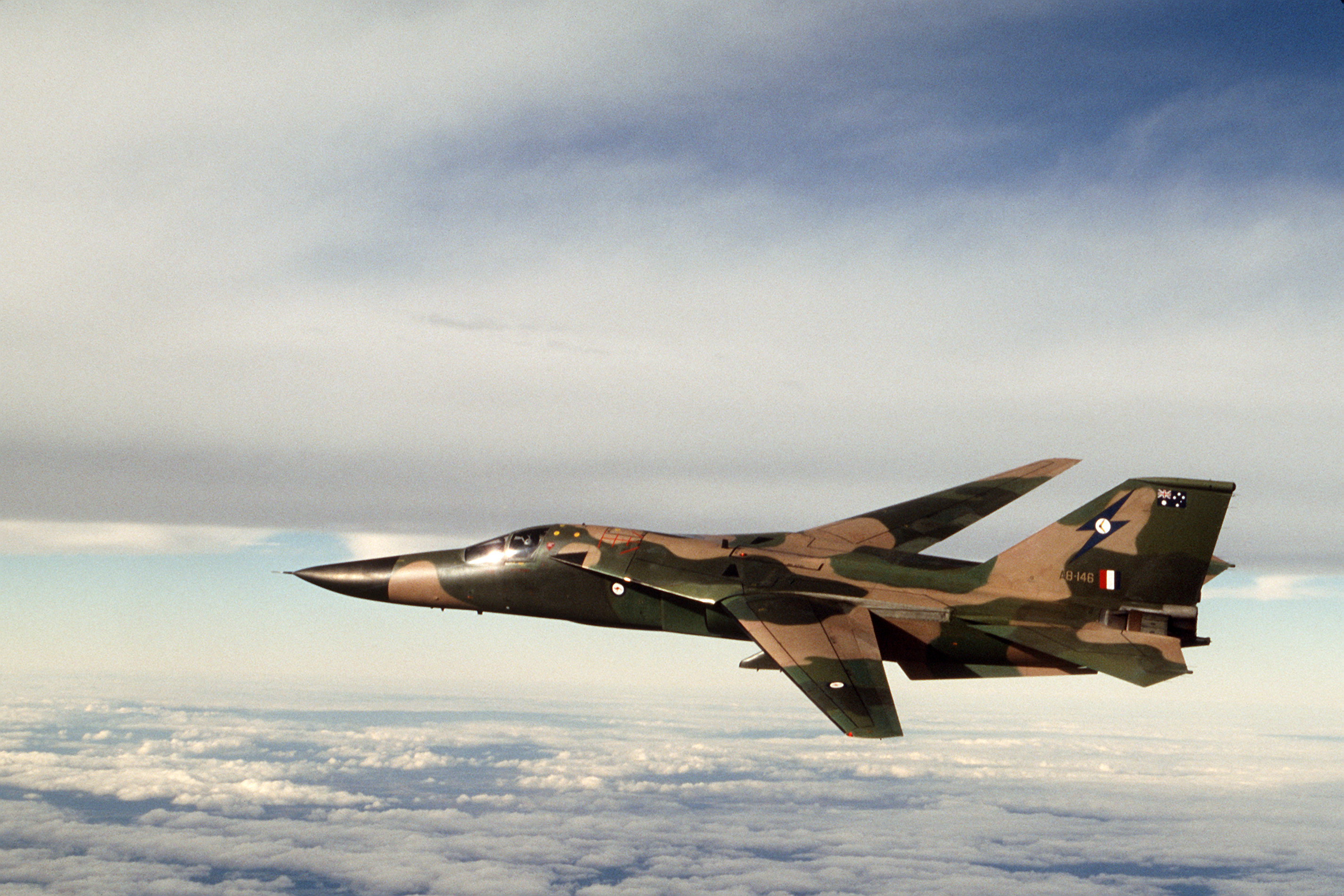
F-111C, maintenance of which was carried out by No. 3 AD from 1973 to 1992

The F-111C represented the most significant maintenance challenge undertaken by the RAAF, and No. 3 AD's hangars and workshops were extensively revamped before and after the new bomber's entry into service in mid-1973. The depot was responsible for major upgrades and complex maintenance involving stripping down the airframe and engines, while intermediate-level servicing was carried out by No. 482 (Maintenance) Squadron, a unit of No. 82 Wing. After General Dynamics in Fort Worth, Texas, had modified the first of four F-111Cs earmarked to be brought up to RF-111C standard for photographic reconnaissance, No. 3 AD modified the remaining three aircraft at Amberley during 1980. In 1982–83, the depot upgraded to C-model standard four F-111As delivered to replace the four F-111Cs from the RAAF's original order that had been lost through accidents. It conducted the F-111 Pave Tack infra-red and laser-guided precision weapons targeting system upgrade in 1985. No. 3 AD also took on responsibility for maintenance of Boeing CH-47 Chinooks after the helicopters entered service with No. 12 Squadron, based at Amberley, in September 1973. The depot had no familiarity dealing with significant damage to the Chinook, and when one of the helicopters crashed following an engine failure in 1975 the repairs were not completed until 1981.

From the 1980s, No. 3 AD's organisation included a maintenance management squadron made up of individual flights responsible for the upkeep of equipment, engines, and airframes, the last-mentioned including armament and de-seal/re-seal. The process for de-sealing and re-sealing the F-111s fuel tanks, which the depot first undertook between 1977 and 1982 and which lasted six months per aircraft, caused controversy owing to the hazardous working conditions for ground crews. Brain damage to personnel caused by chemical exposure resulted in a class action that cost the Australian government more than A$20 million in damages. On 16 March 1992, No. 3 AD merged with No. 482 Squadron to form No. 501 Wing, which became the largest unit in the RAAF, comprising over 1,200 personnel. The depot completed its disbandment on 30 June that year. No. 501 Wing continued to provide deep maintenance and logistics support for the F-111s at Amberley until 2001, when Boeing Australia was awarded the maintenance contract.
