= McDonnell Douglas F-4 Phantom II in Australian service =

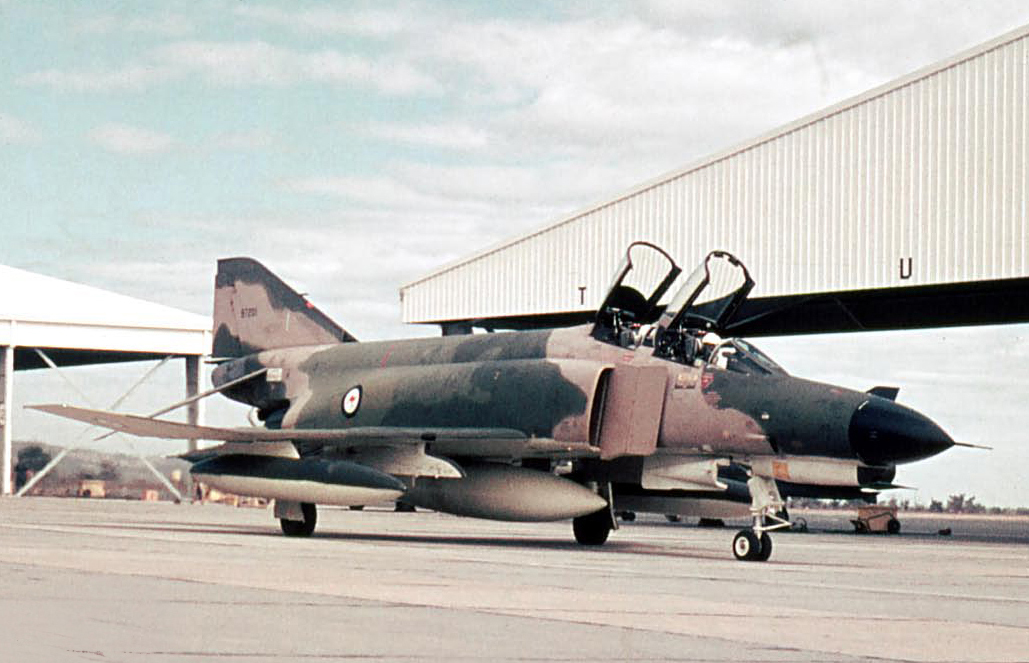
- A RAAF F-4E Phantom II at RAAF Base Pearce in 1971

General information
- Type: Fighter-bomber, used primarily as strike aircraft in RAAF service
- Manufacturer: McDonnell Douglas
- Serial: A69-0304 to A69-0307, A69-7201 to A69-7217, A69-7219 to A69-7220 and A69-7234

History
- In service: 1970–73

The Royal Australian Air Force (RAAF) operated 24 McDonnell Douglas F-4E Phantom II fighter-bomber aircraft in the ground attack role between 1970 and 1973. The Phantoms were leased from the United States Air Force (USAF) as an interim measure owing to delays in the delivery of the RAAF's 24 General Dynamics F-111C bombers. The F-4Es were considered successful in this role, but the government did not agree to a proposal from the RAAF to retain the aircraft after the F-111s entered service in 1973.

The F-4C variant of the Phantom II was among the aircraft evaluated by the RAAF in 1963 as part of the project to replace its English Electric Canberra bombers. The F-111 was selected, but when that project was delayed in the late 1960s due to long-running technical faults with the aircraft, the RAAF determined that the F-4E Phantom II would be the best alternative. As a result of continued problems with the F-111s, the Australian and United States Governments negotiated an agreement in 1970 whereby the RAAF leased 24 F-4Es and their support equipment from the USAF.

The RAAF's F-4Es entered service in September 1970, and proved to be highly effective. Used in the air-to-ground role, they prepared aircrew to operate the sophisticated F-111s, and the intensive training program undertaken using the aircraft improved the RAAF's professional standards. One of the Phantoms was destroyed in a flying accident in June 1971, and another was repaired by the RAAF after it sustained heavy damage during a crash landing. The 23 surviving aircraft were returned to the USAF in two batches during October 1972 and June 1973. Most ex-RAAF F-4Es were converted to F-4G Wild Weasel variants after their return to the US.

== Acquisition ==
The McDonnell Douglas F-4C Phantom II was one of the aircraft types evaluated by the RAAF as a potential replacement for its aging English Electric Canberra bombers in the early 1960s. In mid-1963 a team of senior RAAF officers headed by the Chief of the Air Staff, Air Marshal Valston Hancock, travelled to the United States to evaluate the General Dynamics F-111 (then known as the "TFX"), North American A-5 Vigilante and F-4C Phantom II strike aircraft. While in the United States, the team also inspected the Boeing KC-135 Stratotanker, which was considered necessary to support these aircraft. In addition, the RAAF officers travelled to the United Kingdom and France to evaluate the BAC TSR-2 and Dassault Mirage IV, respectively. In its final report, the team rejected the F-4C on the grounds that the aircraft lacked the range, performance at low altitude and reconnaissance capability that the RAAF required. The F-111 was considered to be the most suitable aircraft of those considered, but the team proposed that the RAAF acquire 36 Vigilantes as they also met the force's requirements and could be delivered within a shorter time frame. The Australian Government rejected this advice, and decided to purchase 24 F-111s. At the time the order was placed in late 1963 these aircraft were scheduled to be delivered in 1967; the delivery date was pushed back to 1968 after Australia decided to order the unique F-111C variant. In late 1963 the United States Government offered to lend Australia 24 Boeing B-47 Stratojet bombers until the F-111s were delivered. The Australian Air Board (Note: The Air Board was the RAAF's highest-level decision-making committee, and was responsible for the force's administration.) opposed acquiring these aircraft on the grounds that they were obsolete and would be expensive to operate. Instead, it recommended to Cabinet that a package of F-4C strike aircraft, the RF-4C reconnaissance variant of this design, and KC-135 tankers be leased from the United States if an interim force was considered necessary. Cabinet considered the two options during 1964, and rejected both of them. Between 1965 and 1970 six Australian pilots serving on exchange postings to the United States Air Force (USAF) flew Phantoms in combat during the Vietnam War.

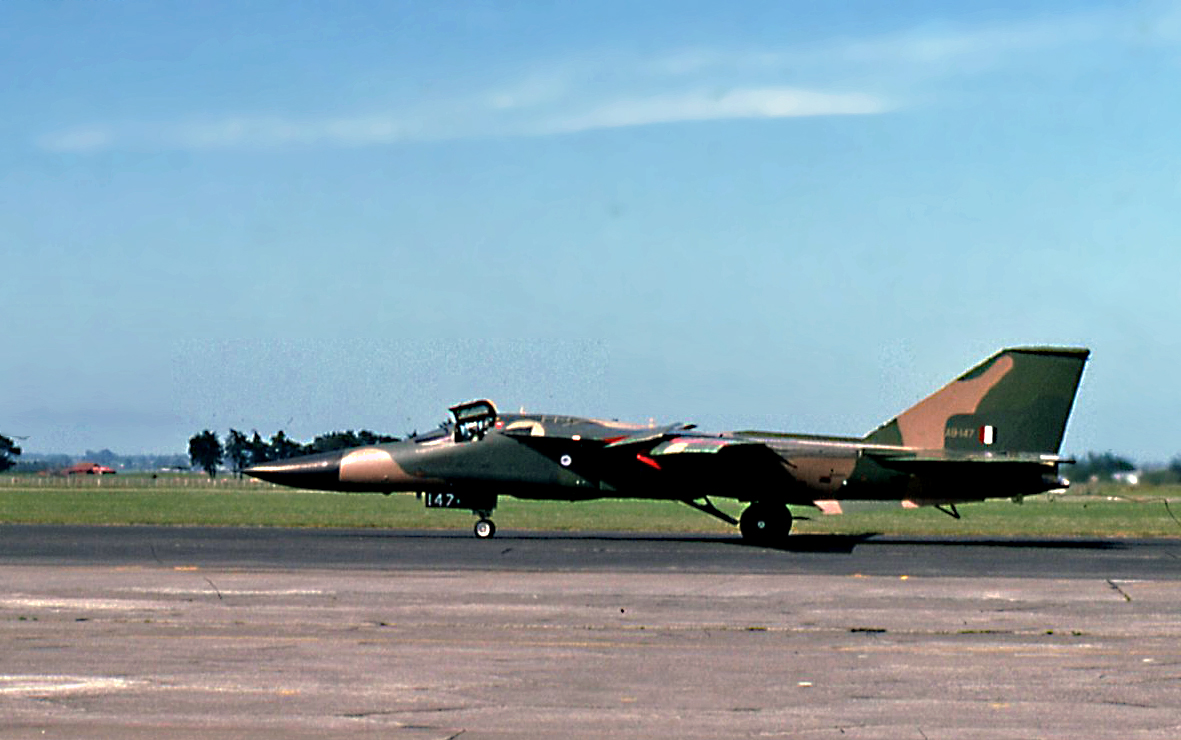
One of the RAAF's F-111C aircraft in 1975

The F-111 program experienced significant problems during the late 1960s. As a result of delays to the development of the RF-111 reconnaissance variant of the F-111, of which Australia had ordered four, the RAAF considered purchasing eight RF-4C or RF-4E reconnaissance aircraft and two tankers in early 1968. The Air Force and government eventually concluded that it was too early to make a decision on this matter, and no action was taken. The RAAF accepted all 24 F-111Cs at a ceremony held at Fort Worth, Texas, on 4 September 1968. At this time the F-111 program was in crisis owing to technical problems with the design of the aircraft's wing assembly, and all F-111s were grounded after an American F-111 crashed on 23 September. Subsequent testing revealed further problems with F-111 components not meeting their intended lifespan, and the Australian aircraft were placed in storage at Fort Worth until these flaws could be rectified. The RAAF subsequently evaluated the F-4E Phantom II, Blackburn Buccaneer, LTV A-7 Corsair II and Grumman A-6 Intruder as possible replacements for the F-111. Only the F-4E was considered to come close to meeting the RAAF's requirements, though its relatively short range and lack of terrain-following radar and electronic countermeasures were considered problematic.

By 1970 the F-111Cs were still not airworthy, and the Australian Government was under pressure to cancel the order or acquire an interim design. In April of that year Minister for Defence Malcolm Fraser signed an agreement with his American counterpart, Melvin R. Laird, which specified the conditions under which the Australian Government would accept the F-111s. As part of the negotiations leading to this agreement, Laird offered to lease Australia 24 F-4E Phantoms at a reduced price. The Cabinet agreed to Fraser's recommendation that this offer be taken up, a move supported by the Air Board. The RAAF remained committed to the F-111C, however, and the Air Board issued a statement during May arguing that these aircraft would "meet the RAAF operational requirement more effectively than the F-4E by a decisive margin".

An RAAF team headed by the Deputy Chief of the Air Staff, Air Vice Marshal Charles Read, was sent to the United States in May 1970 to negotiate the lease arrangements. After considering the proposed deal, Read recommended that it go ahead; according to RAAF historian Alan Stephens this decision "delighted RAAF senior officers and aircrews". The Cabinet subsequently approved the lease of 24 Phantoms for two years at a total cost of $US 41.554 million (including training, spare parts and technical advice) and the formal agreement to do so was signed on 29 June 1970. The USAF designated this project Peace Reef. The terms of the lease agreement allowed the Australian Government to purchase the Phantoms outright if the F-111C program was cancelled, but also allowed the USAF to demand the immediate return of the aircraft and their support equipment in the event of a national emergency. Laird provided Fraser with a written commitment that this option would not be exercised, and it was never publicised. Laird also promised that USAF tankers would be made available to support the Australian Phantoms during crises, subject to American national requirements and the terms of relevant agreements between the two countries.

== Delivery ==
The RAAF's Phantoms were delivered soon after the lease agreement was completed. Australian pilots and navigators from the two units that were to operate the aircraft, No. 1 and No. 6 Squadrons, began to arrive in the United States for conversion training in July 1970. Most of this training was provided by the 4530th Tactical Training Squadron, 1st Tactical Fighter Wing, at MacDill Air Force Base in Florida, and involved 32 hours of flying. USAF personnel were also posted to RAAF Base Amberley in Queensland, where the F-4Es were to be based, to train Australian ground crew. The Australian Phantoms were diverted from USAF orders and were brand new. The RAAF accepted all 24 aircraft in September 1970, and they were subsequently ferried to Amberley in four groups of six aircraft; the first three groups arrived on 14, 19 and 26 September, and the final group arrived on 3 October. The Phantom was allocated the RAAF serial number prefix "A69", but this was never applied to the aircraft, and they retained their USAF serials.

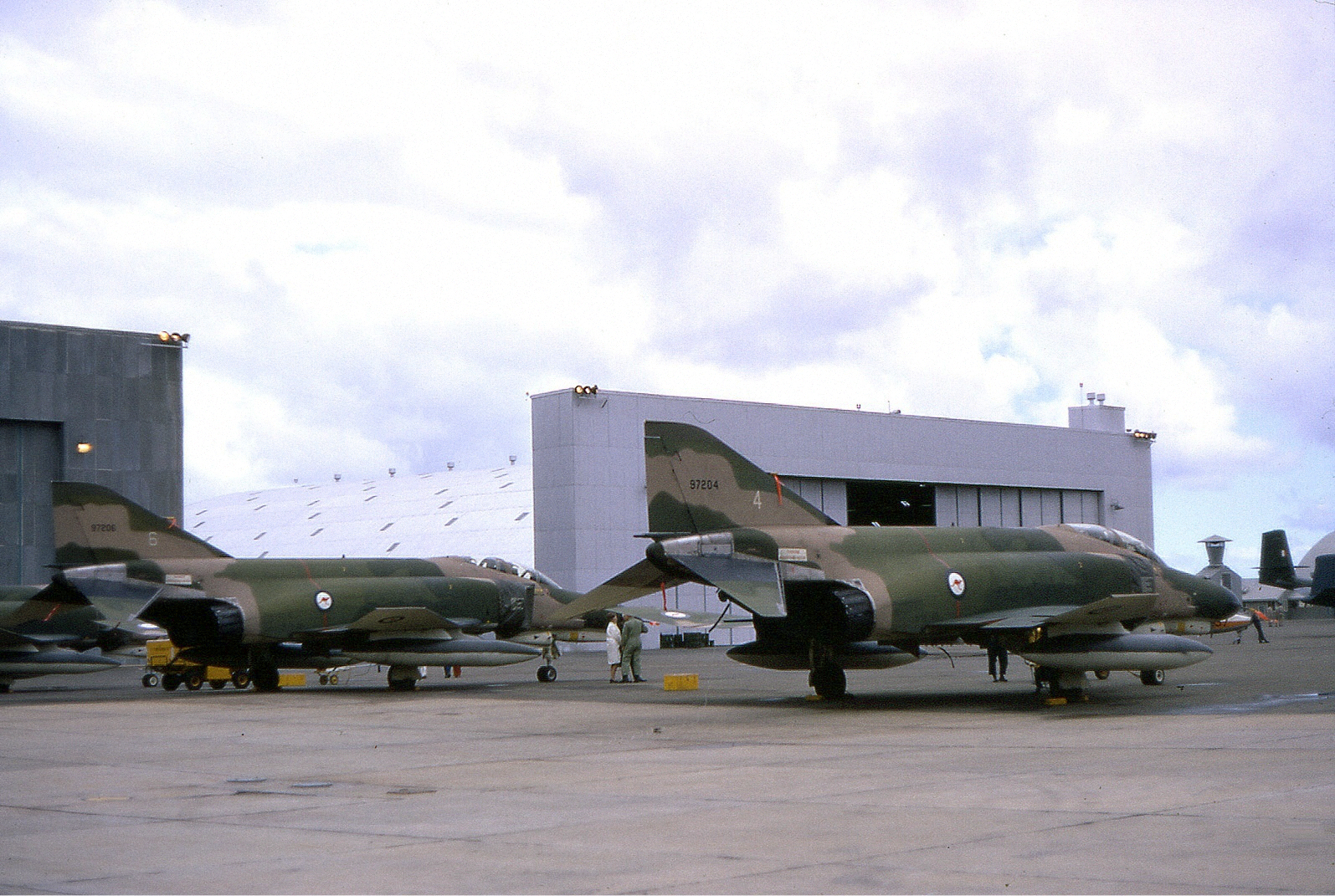
Two of the RAAF's F-4E Phantoms at RAAF Base Edinburgh in 1971

The Phantom represented a significant improvement to the RAAF's ground attack capabilities. The F-4Es were more technologically advanced than the Canberra, as they could fly at supersonic speeds, were equipped with air-to-air radar and missiles, and had an inertial navigation system, ground-attack computer and a cannon. The Phantoms were capable of operating in several roles; the RAAF primarily used them as strike aircraft. This role was selected to prepare aircrew to operate F-111s, and most training exercises were focused on tasks that the F-111s would also be able to perform.

Aircrew training using the F-4Es began three days after the aircraft first arrived at Amberley. The aircraft were initially operated as a pool controlled by No. 82 Wing (the parent headquarters for No. 1 and No. 6 Squadrons) and were allocated between the two squadrons only after all the Phantoms, aircrew and ground crew had arrived in Australia. The training program gradually increased in complexity, with night flying beginning in October, practice-bombing sorties commencing in late November and air-to-air sorties being flown from January 1971. Ground attack missions were practiced from February 1971, and in June that year the Phantoms began dropping live bombs during exercises. The introduction of several of the aircraft into service was delayed by an initial shortage of spare parts, but all were operational by the end of 1970.

== Operational service ==
During their service with the RAAF, the Phantoms were operated alongside the RAAF's Dassault Mirage III fighters and the Royal Australian Navy's Douglas A-4 Skyhawk ground attack aircraft. In addition to routine training flights, the Phantoms participated in major air defence exercises and also flew practice sorties against warships. The F-4Es also took part in airshows, including four that formed part of the flying displays conducted in different parts of Australia to mark the RAAF's 50th anniversary during March and April 1971.

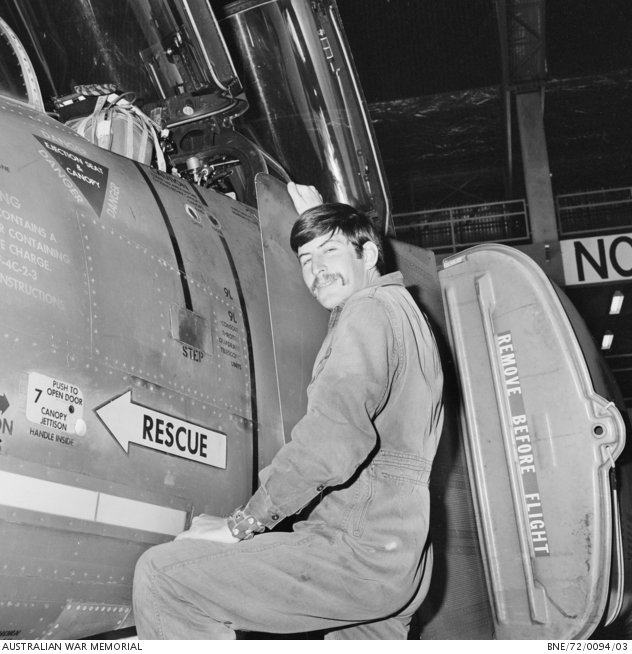
An RAAF airman during an inspection of a F-4 Phantom at RAAF Base Amberley in 1972

Maintenance of the Phantoms was undertaken by No. 482 Squadron and No. 3 Aircraft Depot, both of which were located at Amberley. In addition to routine servicing, these units modified the Phantoms' AN/APQ-120 radars during early 1971. In response to problems detected during maintenance, RAAF technical personnel checked all the aircraft for defects to their emergency flap system in September 1971 and used X-ray testing to detect any cracks in their stabilators during early 1972.

The RAAF's Phantoms suffered several accidents. The first occurred on 19 October 1970 when the systems needed to power the brake skid and nosewheel steering on board Phantom A69-7234 failed during flight. It was decided to use Amberley's arresting equipment to slow the aircraft as it landed, but this system failed after A69-7234's tail hook engaged the wires, causing the Phantom to slide off the runway. The pilot only suffered minor injuries and the navigator was unhurt, but A69-7234 was badly damaged. The aircraft was subsequently rebuilt by No. 3 Aircraft Depot and returned to service on 30 September 1971; at the time this was the most complex Phantom repair task to have been undertaken by military personnel in any of the countries operating the aircraft. The next serious accident occurred on the night of 16 June 1971 when A69-7203 crashed into the sea during an exercise near Evans Head, New South Wales, resulting in the death of the aircraft's pilot and navigator. The cost of this aircraft was written off against that of an Australian Lockheed P-3B Orion that had crashed in the United States during 1968 before being delivered to the RAAF. Other accidents involving the Phantom included A67-7220 being over-stressed in flight during February 1971 (which led to its engines being sent back to the United States for repairs) and A69-7206's nosewheel collapsing during takeoff in January 1972.

The RAAF was highly satisfied with the performance of the F-4Es, and they played an important role in preparing No. 82 Wing to operate the F-111. Many personnel in the Air Force believed that it would have been very difficult for the wing to have transitioned directly from the Canberra to the much more complicated F-111. In particular, the Phantoms gave RAAF personnel experience operating aircraft fitted with sophisticated avionics and capable of using a wide range of weapons, and the intensive training program undertaken by No. 82 Wing during this period significantly improved its professionalism. In his book Going Solo: The Royal Australian Air Force 1946–1971, Alan Stephens also argued that the speed with which the Air Force's aircrew and technical personnel adapted to operating Phantoms "illustrated the RAAF's exceptional technical competence".

== Return to the USAF ==
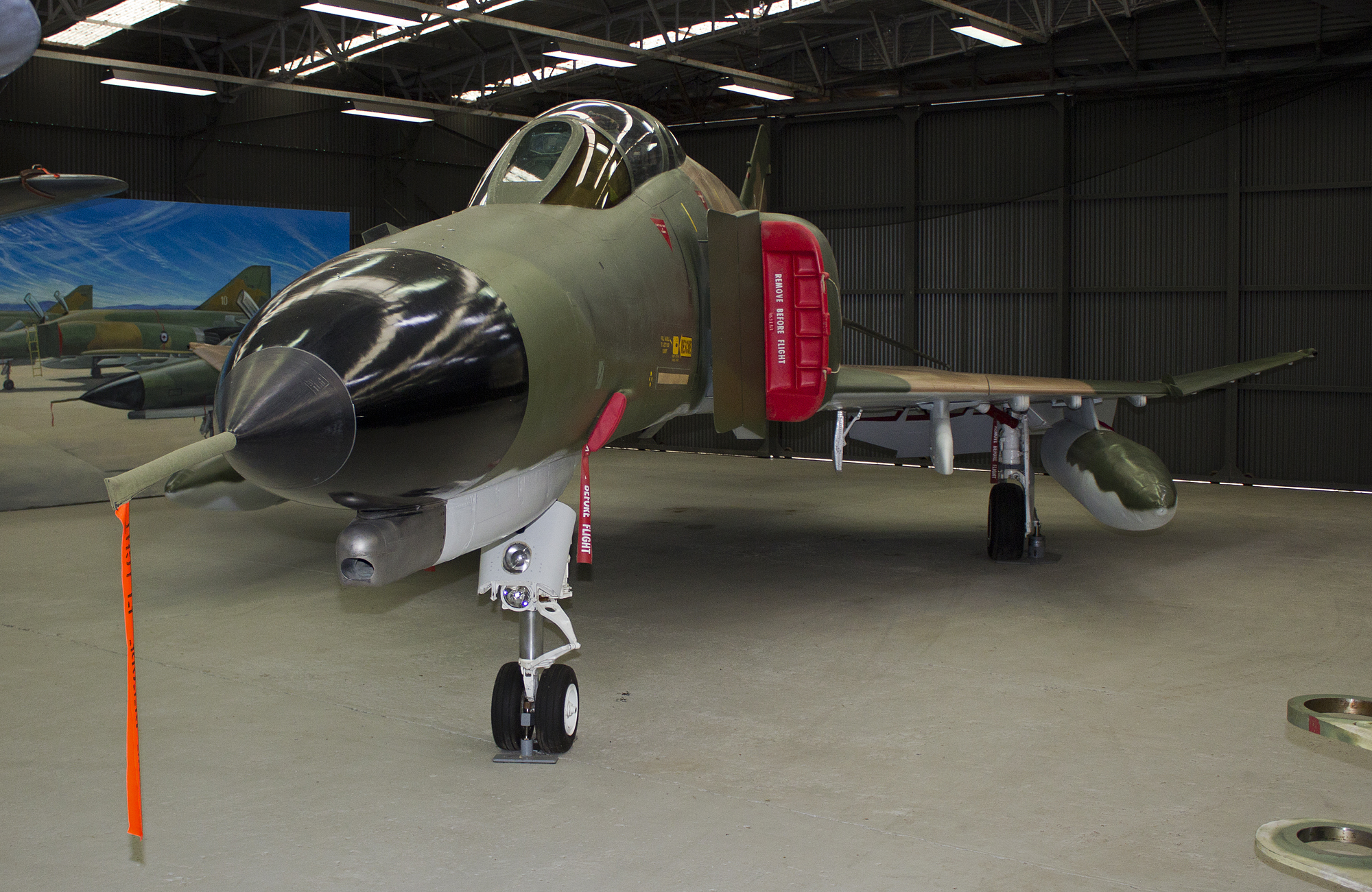
An ex-USAF F-4E (67-0237) on display at the RAAF Museum

Repairs to the RAAF's F-111Cs were undertaken from late 1971, and all 24 were accepted on 15 March 1973. The RAAF considered retaining the Phantoms after the F-111s entered service, and the US Government offered to sell the 23 remaining aircraft to Australia for $54 million. Studies found that the upfront cost of keeping the F-4Es would be $77 million, and that one of the Mirage III squadrons would need to be disbanded to man the Phantom-equipped units. Nevertheless, the Air Board recommended that the aircraft be retained, but a proposal to do so was rejected by the Cabinet in 1972 on advice from the Treasury. If the Phantoms had remained in service they would have been used to provide close air support for the Army.

The Phantoms began to be returned to the USAF in 1972. No. 6 Squadron ceased operating the aircraft on 4 October 1972. Six F-4Es departed for the United States on 25 October that year, followed by a further five in early November. The first six F-111s arrived at Amberley on 1 June 1973, and six Phantoms left for the United States five days later. The final RAAF Phantom flight was made on 20 June, and four of the aircraft departed the next day. The last two Phantoms left Amberley on 21 June. All but two of the former RAAF Phantoms were subsequently converted to specialist Wild Weasel aircraft.

A former USAF F-4E is on display at the RAAF Museum in Melbourne. This aircraft, which did not serve with the RAAF, was presented to the RAAF by the National Museum of the United States Air Force in 1990, and is painted as one of the Phantoms operated by No. 82 Wing.

== Operators ==
- Royal Australian Air Force
  - No. 82 Wing – RAAF Base Amberley
    - No. 1 Squadron
    - No. 6 Squadron

== See also ==
- McDonnell Douglas Phantom in UK service
- McDonnell Douglas F-4 Phantom II non-U.S. operators
