= No. 6 Squadron RAAF =

Royal Australian Air Force squadron

- No. 6 Squadron's crest
- Active: 1917–1919; 1939–1945; 1948–current
- Country: Australia
- Branch: Royal Australian Air Force
- Role: Training (1917–1919); Bomber (1939–1945); Training (1948–2016); Electronic warfare (2017–current)
- Part of: No. 82 Wing
- Garrison/HQ: RAAF Base Amberley
- Mottos: Nous Reviendrons (Latin: "We Shall Return")
- Engagements: World War I World War II
- Battle honours: Moresby 1942; New Britain 1943

Commanders
- Notable commanders: D. E. L. Wilson (1939–1940); Colin Hannah (1942–1943); Ray Funnell (1972–1975); Geoff Shepherd (1991–1993)

Aircraft flown
- Attack: F-4 Phantom II (1970–1972); F/A-18F Super Hornet (2011–2016)
- Bomber: Hudson (1940–1943); Beaufort (1943–1945); Lincoln (1948–1955); Canberra (1955–1970); F-111 (1973–2010)
- Electronic warfare: EA-18G Growler (2017–current)
- Patrol: Anson (1939–1940)
- Reconnaissance: Learjet (1982–1987)

No. 6 Squadron is a Royal Australian Air Force (RAAF) electronic attack squadron. It was formed in 1917 as a training unit based in England during World War I. The squadron was disbanded in 1919 but re-formed at the start of 1939. It subsequently saw combat as a light bomber and maritime patrol squadron during World War II, and took part in the New Guinea Campaign and New Britain Campaign before being disbanded after the war.

The squadron was re-raised in 1948 as the RAAF's bomber operational conversion unit. It has primarily served in this capacity since that time, though it has maintained a secondary strike capability and was also tasked with reconnaissance duties between 1979 and 1993. No. 6 Squadron is based at RAAF Base Amberley, Queensland, and was equipped with Boeing F/A-18F Super Hornet aircraft from January 2011 to December 2016. The squadron converted to Boeing EA-18G Growler electronic attack aircraft in 2017.

== History ==
=== World War I ===
No. 6 Squadron was formed at Parkhouse, England, on 15 June 1917 as a flying training unit of the Australian Flying Corps (AFC). The unit was initially designated No. 30 (Australian Training) Squadron, Royal Flying Corps (RFC), and its role was to train fighter pilots for service with No. 2 Squadron of the AFC (which was designated No. 68 (Australian) Squadron RFC at the time) on the Western Front.

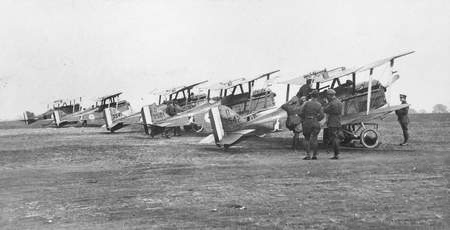
Five of No. 6 Squadron's S.E.5 aircraft at Minchinhampton in 1917

The squadron moved to Shawbury the day after it was formed and then to Ternhill on 29 June. It became part of the 1st Training Wing on 1 September, when that unit was established to command the four AFC training squadrons in England (the others being No. 5, No. 7 and No. 8 Squadrons). In January 1918 the squadron was redesignated No. 6 Squadron AFC; the other AFC units were also renamed at this time. No. 6 Squadron moved to Minchinhampton on 25 February. The squadron used several types of aircraft to train pilots, including the Bristol Scout D, Sopwith 1½ Strutter, Sopwith Pup, Avro 504, Airco DH.5, Royal Aircraft Factory S.E.5 and Sopwith Camel. While most of these aircraft types were obsolescent and suitable only for elementary flight training, the S.E.5s, Sopwith Pups and Sopwith Camels were up to date and in service with combat units in France.

Like the other units of the 1st Training Wing, No. 6 Squadron continued to train pilots after the end of the war. This was undertaken to keep personnel occupied while they awaited transport back to Australia, as well as to strengthen the AFC. No. 6 Squadron was disbanded in March 1919, and its personnel left Minchinhampton to return to Australia on 6 May that year.

=== World War II ===
On 1 January 1939 No. 4 Squadron, which was located at RAAF Station Richmond in the outskirts of Sydney and equipped with Avro Anson patrol aircraft, was redesignated No. 6 Squadron. No. 4 Squadron had been responsible for conducting reconnaissance patrols along Australia's east coast as well as undertaking training exercises with the Royal Australian Navy (RAN). These duties continued after the squadron was re-designated, and early in 1939 it gained the additional role of providing conversion training on the Anson for new pilots and air gunners. The squadron's maritime patrol activities were hindered by the limitations of its Ansons, which were obsolete and had an inadequate range and bomb load. On 28 April 1939, an Anson of No. 6 Squadron crashed near Riverstone, killing all four crew members.

Following the outbreak of World War II, No. 6 Squadron escorted convoys off the Australian east coast and undertook training exercises with the Australian Army and RAN. The squadron's Ansons were replaced by twelve Mark I Lockheed Hudson light bombers during April and May 1940. These aircraft were much more capable than the Ansons, having a longer range, higher speed and greater bomb load. No. 6 Squadron continued to be based at Richmond, though detachments moved to other airstrips along the east coast when the squadron escorted troop convoys. In August 1940 the squadron conducted long-range patrols searching for German raiders which were present in the Tasman Sea, but without success.

No. 6 Squadron continued its maritime patrol tasks in the months after the outbreak of the Pacific War in December 1941. At this time the squadron comprised six aircraft based at Richmond and another four based at RAAF Station Laverton near Melbourne. In late December, eight of the squadron's Hudsons were dispatched to Malaya to make good the losses suffered by No. 1 and No. 8 Squadrons in the Malayan Campaign. No. 6 Squadron was re-equipped with longer-ranged Mark IV Hudsons by January 1942. Early that month, two of these aircraft were dispatched to undertake an urgent photo reconnaissance of the Japanese base at Truk in the Central Pacific on the orders of Air Vice Marshal William Bostock. One of the aircraft suffered mechanical problems after arriving at the forward airfield at Kavieng in New Ireland from where this operation was to be conducted, but the other successfully overflew Truk on 8 January; this was the longest photo reconnaissance flight undertaken by land-based RAAF aircraft during World War II. On 22 January a flight of four aircraft was detached from No. 6 Squadron and transferred to the newly formed No. 32 Squadron at Port Moresby in New Guinea. The squadron's maritime patrol role increased in importance from May 1942 when Japanese submarines began operating off the Australian east coast. On 5 June the crew of a No. 6 Squadron Hudson attacked what they believed was a submerged submarine 190 kilometres (120 mi) northeast of Sydney. During mid-1942 the squadron gave up its Mark IV Hudsons, and was re-equipped with Mark III models.

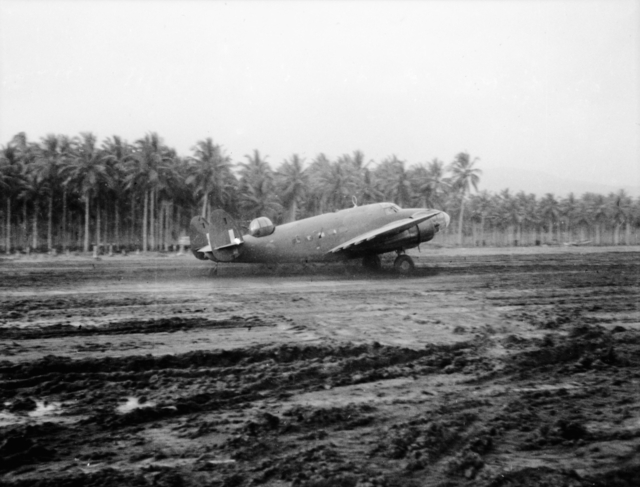
A No. 6 Squadron Hudson taxiing on Gurney Field at Milne Bay during September or October 1942

In late August 1942, No. 6 Squadron moved to Horn Island in the Torres Strait and established a detachment of four aircraft at Gurney Field, Milne Bay in New Guinea. The Milne Bay detachment had been formed to provide reconnaissance and bomber support of the Australian garrison, which was expected to be attacked. Japanese forces landed at Milne Bay on the night of 25/26 August, sparking the Battle of Milne Bay, which ended in an Allied victory in early September. No. 6 Squadron flew reconnaissance and anti-shipping patrols from the airfields at Milne Bay throughout the battle. The squadron attacked a convoy of three Japanese destroyers and three patrol boats carrying reinforcement troops to Milne Bay on 29 August. Although the squadron claimed to have damaged a destroyer in this operation, the Japanese force did not actually incur any damage. Following the Allied victory at Milne Bay, No. 6 Squadron Hudsons continued to patrol the region near Milne Bay, and sank a Japanese transport ship near Woodlark Island on 26 September. The Horn Island-based elements of the squadron moved to Wards Strip near the town of Port Moresby in New Guinea on 11 October to conduct anti-submarine patrols alongside No. 100 Squadron. For much of November the squadron also supported the Australian Army force engaged in the Kokoda Track campaign by dropping supplies and evacuating sick soldiers. From 6 December until near the end of that month, No. 6 Squadron conducted night-bombing raids of the Japanese beachhead at Buna, Sanananda and Gona; these included an attack on a destroyer off Buna. Towards the end of December the squadron was concentrated at Turnbull Field at Milne Bay to undertake reconnaissance and anti-submarine patrols.

On the night of 17 January 1943, 24 Japanese aircraft attacked Turnbull Field, destroying one of No. 6 Squadron's Hudsons and damaging the remainder. The squadron was unable to conduct any operations for several weeks after this attack, but the damaged aircraft were repaired. In March, No. 6 Squadron participated in the Battle of the Bismarck Sea by searching for barges and attacking lifeboats carrying survivors from the Japanese ships which had been sunk. Due to the unit's high rate of flying activities, No. 6 Squadron's Hudsons increasingly suffered from mechanical problems, and this may have contributed to a drop in the number of hours flown by the squadron from March 1943. On 20 July No. 9 Operational Group, which commanded No. 6 Squadron and other RAAF units in New Guinea, banned the squadron's Hudsons from taking part in any further combat operations due to their poor condition. It was decided at about this time to re-equip the squadron with Australian-built Bristol Beauforts. To effect this change No. 6 Squadron's Hudson crews flew their aircraft back to Australia and were replaced by new aircrews equipped with Beauforts from September. In the meantime, the squadron's ground crew were often used as labourers as they did not have any aircraft to maintain.

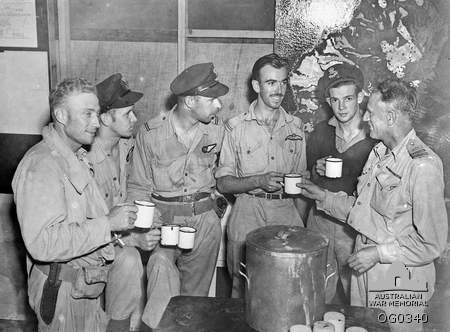
A group of No. 6 Squadron aircrew following a raid on Rabaul during November 1943

After receiving its new aircraft, the squadron was tasked with anti-shipping attacks, and it cooperated with No. 100 Squadron in an attack on a Japanese convoy near Cape St. George on the night of 20 October during which a No. 6 Squadron pilot claimed to have damaged a cruiser. No. 6 Squadron also bombed Japanese positions in New Britain during October in conjunction with No. 100 Squadron. As well as these offensive operations, the squadron regularly flew anti-submarine patrols to protect Allied shipping. In November the squadron moved to Goodenough Island and became part of No. 71 Wing RAAF alongside No. 8 and No. 100 Squadrons. From November 1943 to March 1944, No. 6 Squadron took part in attacks on the major Japanese base at Rabaul, and also struck other targets in the region to support the naval and ground forces engaged in the New Britain Campaign. From March the squadron mainly undertook convoy escort and anti-submarine patrols, which proved uneventful. No. 6 Squadron's operations were hampered by mechanical problems with its Beauforts, which had been issued to the unit after being reconditioned following service with other RAAF squadrons, and this problem continued until October when it received an allocation of recently built aircraft.

No. 6 Squadron next saw action in late 1944. From late October it and the other units of No. 71 Wing conducted attacks on Rabaul and other locations in New Britain to support the Australian 5th Division's Landing at Jacquinot Bay and subsequent operations on the island. Between December 1944 and January 1945, No. 6 Squadron moved to Dobodura airfield to support Australian Army operations in New Britain and the Aitape–Wewak area of New Guinea. There were few targets within range of Dobodura, and the squadron saw little combat during 1945. Despite the limited nature of the raids conducted from Dobodura, the squadron's offensive operations were hampered by a shortage of bombs. A detachment of six aircraft was deployed to Tadji between late April and 13 May to participate in attacks on Japanese positions near Wewak alongside Beauforts from No. 7, No. 8, No. 15 and No. 100 Squadrons. The squadron conducted little operational flying from late May, and in June its commander recommended in his monthly report that No. 6 Squadron be either disbanded or re-equipped and sent to a more active area. RAAF Headquarters did not respond to this proposal, and many other Australian squadrons were similarly under-employed at the time. The squadron's last combat operations were undertaken by a detachment of two Beauforts which were deployed to Biak during July; these aircraft bombed Japanese positions in the area alongside P-40 Kittyhawks operated by No. 120 (NEI) Squadron. Following the end of the war the squadron dropped leaflets to advise Japanese troops that their country had surrendered and continued to make anti-submarine patrols. In September all of the squadron's aircrew were posted to units located further from Australia and were replaced by aircrew from these squadrons. The squadron also began regular courier flights between Dobodura and Milne Bay during the month. No. 6 Squadron remained at Dobodura until 18 October 1945, when it returned to Australia and was disbanded at Kingaroy, Queensland, on the 31st of the month. The squadron suffered 35 fatalities during World War II.

=== Operational conversion unit ===
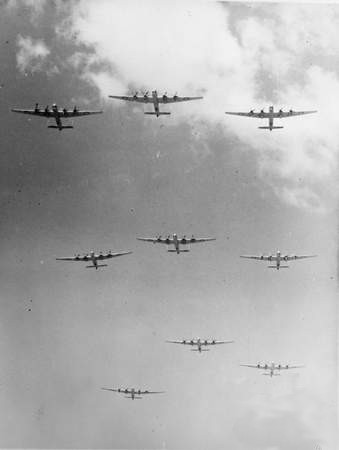
A formation of nine Avro Lincoln heavy bombers from No. 2 and No. 6 Squadrons flying over RAAF Base Amberley in 1953

On 23 February 1948, No. 23 Squadron was redesignated No. 6 Squadron. The unit was based at RAAF Base Amberley in Queensland and equipped with Avro Lincoln heavy bombers. No 6 Squadron formed part of No. 82 Wing, and was primarily responsible for training aircrews to serve with the wing's two front-line units; No. 1 and No. 2 Squadrons. Its training effort was increased from 1950 when No. 1 Squadron was deployed to Malaya as part of Australia's contribution to the Malayan Emergency. During October that year three of No. 6 Squadron's Lincolns were deliberately flown through the cloud resulting from the first British atomic bomb test (Operation Hurricane) which took place in the Montebello Islands off Western Australia. These aircraft had the role of determining the level of radioactivity caused by the atomic blast, and No. 6 Squadron performed similar duties for the subsequent British atomic bomb tests at Maralinga, South Australia. Several Lincolns were so heavily contaminated with radioactivity during these flights that they could not be flown again. The squadron lost three Lincolns in one day on 8 April 1953 when one was written off after its undercarriage collapsed while landing at Amberley and a further two were destroyed when they collided on the ground at Cloncurry, Queensland; no aircrew were injured in these accidents.

No. 6 Squadron's Lincolns were replaced with Canberra jet bombers in early 1955, and the unit became operational with these aircraft on 11 July. As part of the transition to the Canberra, the squadron's remaining aircrew were posted to the Lincoln Conversion Flight, which continued to support No. 1 Squadron in Malaya, and replacement aircrew were posted from No. 2 Squadron. The squadron suffered a number of accidents during the next two years in which several Canberras were damaged as a result of defects with the aircraft. No. 6 Squadron continued its training duties with the new aircraft; these included regular deployments to Darwin in the Northern Territory to participate in air defence exercises as well as training flights to Malaya and New Zealand. In early 1967 most of the squadron's personnel were transferred to No. 2 Squadron to bring that unit up to its full strength before it deployed to South Vietnam as part of Australia's commitment to the Vietnam War. From this point onwards, No. 6 Squadron was heavily engaged in training aircrew for service in South Vietnam.

During the late 1960s, No. 1 and No. 6 Squadrons were scheduled to be re-equipped with General Dynamics F-111C strike aircraft from 1968. Mechanical problems with United States Air Force (USAF) F-111s caused the RAAF to postpone its acceptance of these aircraft, leading to a requirement for an interim aircraft to equip both squadrons. McDonnell Douglas F-4 Phantom IIs were leased from the USAF, and No. 6 Squadron was re-equipped with these aircraft between September and October 1970. The Phantoms proved highly successful, though one was severely damaged on its first flight at Amberley when it attempted an emergency landing and the arrester cable failed. It was repaired by No. 3 Aircraft Depot. No. 6 Squadron's remaining Phantoms were handed back to the USAF on 4 October 1972 prior to the delivery of the F-111Cs.

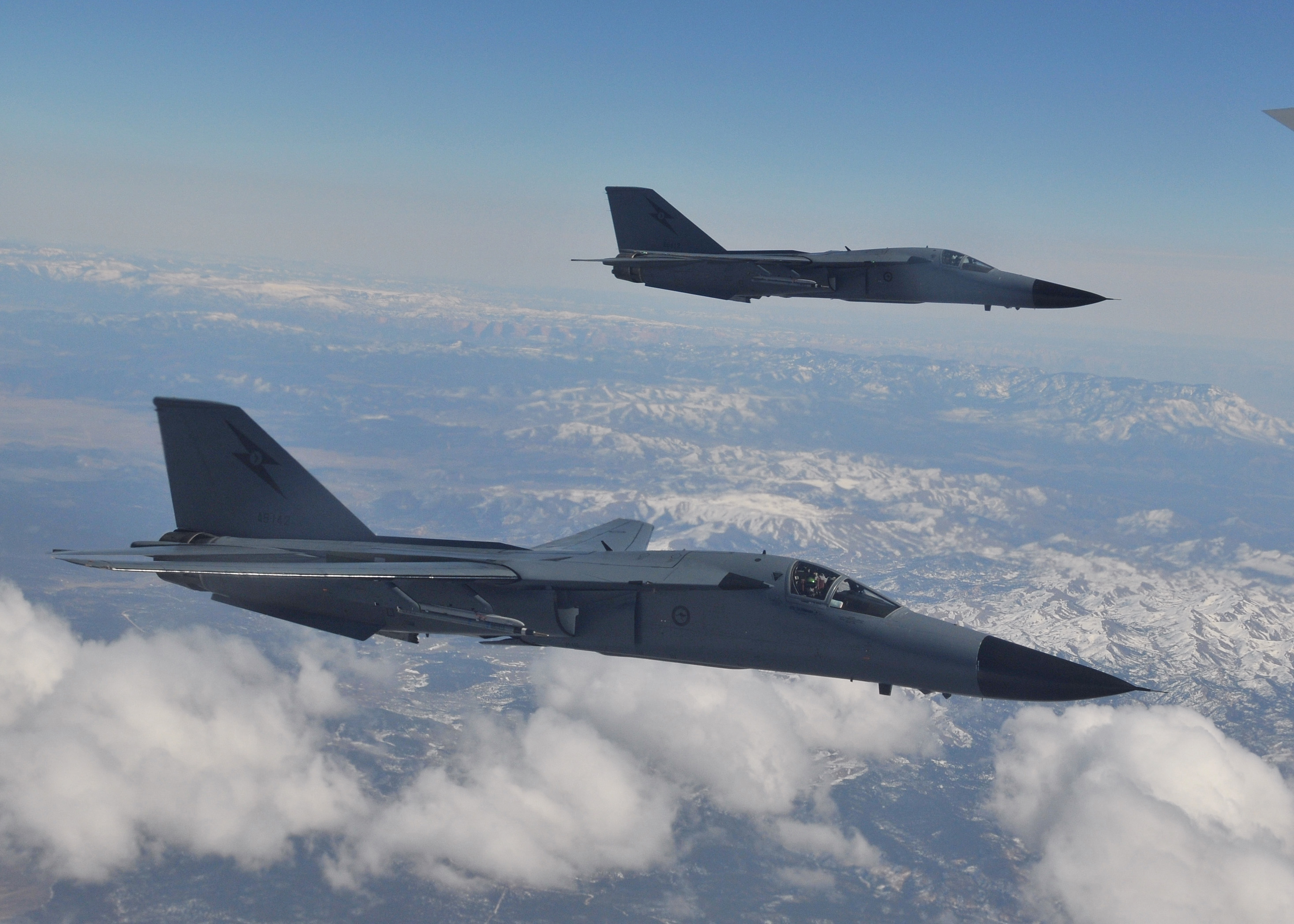
Two No. 6 Squadron F-111Cs in 2009

No. 6 Squadron's first F-111Cs arrived at Amberley on 1 June 1973, and the unit flew its first sorties with the aircraft on the 13th of the month. The squadron's main role remained that of an operational conversion unit, though it had a secondary strike role. From August 1979, No. 6 Squadron gained a photo reconnaissance role when it was issued with four aircraft which had been modified into RF-111Cs. These four aircraft were concentrated the squadron's Reconnaissance Flight, which included photo analysts as well as specialised aircrew. Training was conducted in Australia and nearby countries, and the RF-111Cs occasionally deployed to the United States to take part in exercises. In June 1982 No. 6 Squadron was expanded to include a Survey Flight, which undertook photo survey flights in co-operation with the Army's Royal Australian Survey Corps using a leased Learjet. The flight conducted surveys of south-eastern Australia, northern Australia, Fiji and parts of Indonesia and Malaysia until it was disbanded on 15 May 1987.

In 1993 No. 6 Squadron's F-111Cs were replaced by F-111Gs which had been purchased from the USAF in 1992 to be used for training purposes. This purchase allowed Australia's F-111Cs to be used mainly for strike and reconnaissance purposes and extended the type's expected life in RAAF service. All the F-111Gs were assigned to No, 6 Squadron, and the unit's F-111C and RF-111C aircraft were transferred to No. 1 Squadron. The squadron typically had seven F-111Gs operational at any point.

In 2002 the Australian Government decided to retire the F-111s in 2010 and replace them with Lockheed Martin F-35 Lightning II aircraft, which at the time were expected to be delivered from 2012. As a result of delays to the F-35 program, the government decided in early 2007 to re-equip both No. 1 and No. 6 Squadrons with Boeing F/A-18F Super Hornet aircraft on an interim basis. No. 6 Squadron's F-111Gs were progressively retired over the next few months as they became due for major servicing, and the last flew on 3 September. The final F-111 operational conversion course was completed in mid-2008, and all the remaining F-111Cs and RF-111Cs were transferred to No. 6 Squadron in November 2008 when No. 1 Squadron began the process of converting to F/A-18Fs. For the next two years No. 6 Squadron operated as a bomber and reconnaissance unit. No. 6 Squadron's F-111s were formally retired in a ceremony held at Amberley on 3 December 2010 and No. 1 Squadron was declared operational with its new aircraft several days later. No. 6 Squadron began converting to F/A-18F Super Hornets from January 2011, and became operational with these aircraft on 1 March that year. The squadron's first Super Hornet operational conversion course finished in October 2011.

=== Electronic attack unit ===
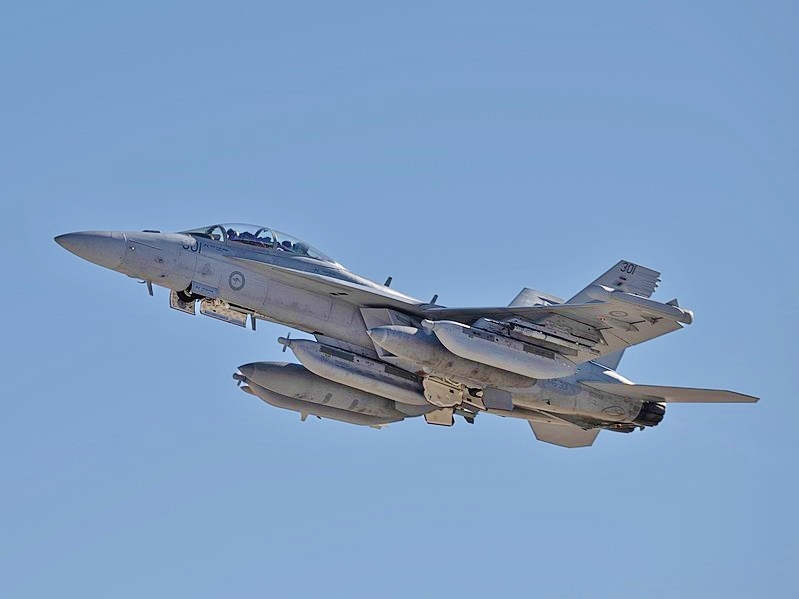
A No. 6 Squadron EA-18G Growler in January 2023

In May 2013, the Federal government announced plans to purchase twelve Boeing EA-18G Growlers to supplement the Super Hornet fleet. No. 6 Squadron was expected to begin taking delivery of the Growlers in 2017; on 23 November 2016 its Super Hornets were transferred to No. 1 Squadron. As of 2014, the squadron was expected to achieve initial operating capability with the Growlers in June 2018 and full operating capacity in 2022. On 7 July 2017 the delivery of last of the EA-18G Growlers was completed.

In January 2018 the EA-18G aircraft had their first international deployment, to the Red Flag military exercise in the United States. On 28 January, EA-18G A46-311 burst into flames on take-off, causing substantial damage. After a 9-day grounding the remaining EA-18G aircraft commenced flying again on 8 February. The damaged aircraft was later judged to be beyond economic repair, and written off. The Growler force achieved initial operating capability on 30 April 2019. A replacement for the Growler that was destroyed in 2018 was ordered in 2022. It was delivered in February 2023.
