= List of World War I aces from Australia =

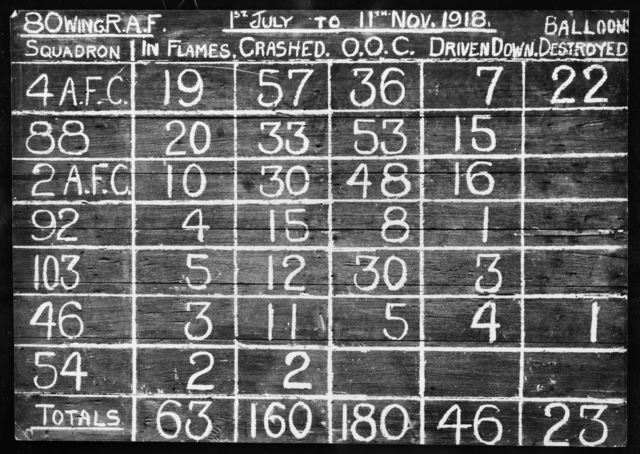
Serny, France, November 1918. A score board recording the claims for enemy aircraft destroyed by No. 80 Wing RAF from July – November 1918. The squadrons listed include No. 2 Squadron, Australian Flying Corps and No. 4 Squadron, AFC. The other columns are headed "In Flames", "Crashed", "O.O.C." (Out of Control), "Driven Down" and "Balloons Destroyed"."

The following is the list of World War I aces from Australia. During the war Australian pilots served in a range of units in the Australian Flying Corps (AFC) and in the British Royal Naval Air Service (RNAS), Royal Flying Corps (RFC) and later the Royal Air Force (RAF). Australia was the only Dominion to have its own independent air arm during the war. Pilots were considered to be "aces" after they had shot down five or more enemy aircraft; 81 Australians are believed to have achieved this feat, with the highest scorer being Robert Alexander Little, who is credited with 47 air victories.

== Australian WWI aces ==
Name	Squadron(s)	Victories	Notes
Robert Alexander Little	No. 1 Naval Wing, No. 8 Squadron RNAS, No. 203 Squadron RAF	47	
Roderic Stanley Dallas	No. 1 Naval Wing, No. 1 Squadron RNAS, No. 40 Squadron RAF	39	
Arthur Henry Cobby	No. 4 Squadron AFC	29	
Elwyn Roy King	No. 4 Squadron AFC	26	
Alexander Augustus Pentland	No. 16 Squadron RFC, No. 29 Squadron RFC, No. 19 Squadron RFC, No. 87 Squadron RAF	23	
Edgar McCloughry	No. 23 Squadron RFC, No. 4 Squadron AFC	21	
Richard Pearman Minifie	No. 1 Naval Wing, No. 1 Squadron RNAS	21	
Edgar Charles Johnston	No. 24 Squadron RFC, No. 88 Squadron RAF	20	
Andrew King Cowper	No. 24 Squadron RAF	19	
Cedric Ernest Howell	No. 45 Squadron RAF	19	
Fred Parkinson Holliday	No. 48 Squadron RFC	17	Australian-born; as a child, lived in UK and later moved to Canada before WW1
Allan Captain Hepburn	No. 24 Squadron RFC, No. 40 Squadron RFC, No. 88 Squadron RAF	16	
Francis Ryan Smith	No. 2 Squadron AFC	16	
John Rutherford Gordon	No. 62 Squadron RAF	15	
Roy Cecil Phillipps	No. 32 Squadron RFC, No. 2 Squadron AFC	15	
Arthur Coningham	No. 32 Squadron RFC, No. 92 Squadron RAF	14	
Herbert Gilles Watson	No. 4 Squadron AFC	14	
Harold Alan Hamersley	No. 60 Squadron RFC	13	
Eric John Stephens	No. 41 Squadron RAF	13	
Thomas Charles Richmond Baker	No. 4 Squadron AFC	12	
Raymond James Brownell	No. 45 Squadron RFC	12	
Roby Lewis Manuel	No. 2 Squadron AFC	12	
Cecil Roy Richards	No. 20 Squadron RFC	12	
Leonard Thomas Eaton Taplin	No. 67 Squadron RFC, No. 1 Squadron AFC, No. 4 Squadron AFC	12	
Henry Garnet Forrest	No. 43 Squadron RFC, No. 32 Squadron RFC, No. 2 Squadron AFC	11	
Geoffrey Herbert Hooper	No. 11 Squadron RFC, No. 20 Squadron RAF	11	
Geoffrey Forrest Hughes	No. 62 Squadron RAF	11	
Herbert Joseph Larkin	No. 5 Squadron RFC, No. 87 Squadron RAF	11	
Ross Macpherson Smith	No. 67 Squadron RFC, No. 1 Squadron AFC	11	
Adrian Trevor Cole	No. 1 Squadron AFC, No. 2 Squadron AFC	10	
Stanley James Goble	No. 1 Naval Wing, No. 8 Squadron RNAS, No. 5 Squadron RNAS, No. 205 Squadron RAF	10	
Alfred Seymour Shepherd	No. 29 Squadron RFC	10	
Eric Douglas Cummings	No. 2 Squadron AFC	9	
Arthur Thomas Drinkwater	No. 57 Squadron RFC, No. 40 Squadron RAF	9	
Richard Watson Howard	No. 68 Squadron RFC, No. 57 Squadron RFC, No. 2 Squadron AFC	9	
Gregory Hamilton Blaxland	No. 2 Squadron AFC	8	
Clive Alexander Brewster-Joske	No. 1 Squadron RFC, No. 46 Squadron RFC	8	
Roy Maxwell Drummond	No. 67 Squadron RFC, No. 111 Squadron RFC	8	
Garfield Finlay	No. 1 Squadron AFC	8	
George Clifton Peters	No. 1 Squadron AFC	8	
Richard Watson Howard	No. 57 Squadron RFC, No. 68 Squadron RFC, No. 2 Squadron AFC	8	
George Goodman Simpson	No. 8 Squadron RNAS	8	
Leslie Sutherland	No. 1 Squadron AFC	8	
Frank Alberry	No. 2 Squadron AFC	7	
Thomas Henry Barkell	No. 4 Squadron AFC	7	
Ernest Edgar Davies	No. 2 Squadron AFC	7	
George Jones	No. 4 Squadron AFC	7	
Edward Patrick Kenney	No. 1 Squadron AFC	7	
Walter Kirk	No. 1 Squadron AFC	7	
Paul Joseph McGinness	No. 1 Squadron AFC	7	
Arthur John Palliser	No. 4 Squadron AFC	7	
George Clifton Peters	No. 1 Squadron AFC	7	
Lancelot Lytton Richardson	No. 25 Squadron RFC	7	
Albert Ernest Robertson	No. 4 Squadron AFC	7	
Charles Owen Stone	No. 2 Squadron AFC	7	
Norman Charles Trescowthick	No. 4 Squadron AFC	7	
George H. D. Gossip	No. 4 Squadron RNAS	6	
John Hay	No. 40 Squadron RFC	6	
Philip Andrew Johnston	No. 8 Squadron RNAS	6	
George Alexander Lingham	No. 43 Squadron RAF	6	
Garnet Francis Malley	No. 4 Squadron AFC	6	
Robert William McKenzie	No. 2 Squadron AFC	6	
Harry Alexander Rigby	No. 40 Squadron RFC, No. 1 Squadron RAF	6	
Eric Landon Simonson	No. 2 Squadron AFC	6	
Claud Robert James Thompson	No. 19 Squadron RFC	6	
Albert Tonkin	No. 1 Squadron AFC	6	
James Hamilton Traill	No. 1 Squadron AFC	6	
William James Alexander Weir	No. 1 Squadron AFC	6	
James Joseph Wellwood	No. 2 Squadron AFC	6	
Allan Runciman Brown	No. 1 Squadron AFC	5	
Alexander Clark	No. 2 Squadron AFC	5	
George Cox	No. 2 Squadron AFC	5	
Sydney Dalrymple	No. 24 Squadron RFC, No. 27 Squadron RFC, No. 139 Squadron RAF	5	
Herbert James Edwards	No. 32 Squadron RFC, No. 92 Squadron RFC	5	
Wilmot Hudson Fysh	No. 1 Squadron AFC, No. 67 Squadron RAF	5	
Walter Irving Newby Grant	No. 88 Squadron RFC	5	
Eustace Headlam	No. 1 Squadron RFC, No. 2 Squadron RFC, No. 67 Squadron AFC	5	
Les Holden	No. 2 Squadron AFC	5	
Ernest Mustard	No. 1 Squadron AFC	5	
Patrick Gordon Taylor	No. 66 Squadron RFC	5	
John Seymour Turnbull	No. 56 Squadron RFC, No. 41 Squadron RAF	5	

== See also ==
- Aerial victory standards of World War I
