= Leslie Sutherland =

- Born: 17 December 1892; Murrumbeena, Victoria, Australia
- Died: 24 October 1967 (aged 74)
- Military career
- Allegiance: Australia
- Branch: Australian Army (1910–24); Royal Australian Air Force (1924–27)
- Service years: 1910–1927
- Rank: Lieutenant
- Nickname: "Woodie"
- Unit: No. 1 Squadron AFC
- Conflicts: First World War; Gallipoli campaign; Sinai and Palestine campaign
- Awards: Military Cross; Distinguished Conduct Medal; Mentioned in Despatches

Leslie William Sutherland, MC, DCM (17 December 1892 – 24 October 1967) was an Australian aviator and flying ace credited with eight aerial victories while serving with the Australian Flying Corps in the First World War.
