= Robert McKenzie (aviator) =

Robert William McKenzie
- Born: June 1895; Adelaide, Australia
- Died: 28 April 1945 (aged 49); Sydney, New South Wales
- Military career
- Allegiance: Australia
- Branch: Medical corps; aviation
- Rank: Lieutenant
- Units: No. 41 Squadron RFC, No. 68 Squadron RFC/No. 2 Squadron AFC
- Awards: Military Cross

Lieutenant Robert William McKenzie (June 1895 – 28 April 1945) was an Australian World War I flying ace credited with six aerial victories.

== Early life ==
McKenzie was a chemist in his home town of Adelaide, Australia before joining the Australian Army Medical Corps once World War I began.

== Aerial service ==
He transferred into the Australian Flying Corps (AFC), undertook pilot's training, and in September 1917 was posted to No. 2 Squadron AFC (originally referred to by British authorities as No. 68 Squadron RAF). McKenzie scored his first victory while piloting an Airco DH.5; he destroyed a German Albatros D.V on 1 December 1917. His unit then re-equipped with Royal Aircraft Factory SE.5as. McKenzie used the upgraded machines to score five victories in just over a month, from 19 February through 23 March 1918; his final tally was one enemy observation plane set afire in midair, three Albatros D.Vs and an observation plane destroyed, and one observation plane sent down out of control. He was then posted to RFC Home Establishment for the remainder of the war.

== Later life ==
He died in a boating accident in 1945.

== See also ==
- No. 68 Squadron RAF
