= Antcliffe =

Antcliffe is a surname. Notable people with the surname include:

- Ernest Antcliffe (1898–1974), British World War I flying ace gunner
- Herbert Antcliffe (1875–1964), British musicologist
- John Antcliffe, guitarist with English heavy rock bands Chrome Molly and Blitzkrieg
