= No. 8 Squadron RAAF =

Royal Australian Air Force squadron

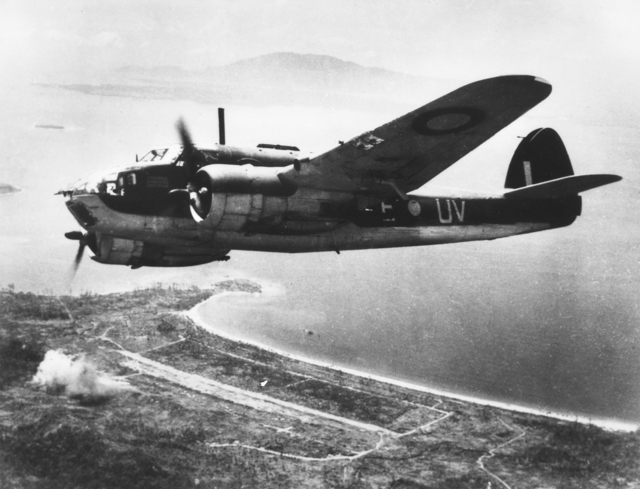
- A No. 8 Squadron Beaufort during an attack on Wewak in 1944
- Active: 1917–1919; 1940–1942; 1943–1946
- Country: Australia
- Branch: Australian Flying Corps; Royal Australian Air Force
- Engagements: World War I World War II

No. 8 Squadron was an Australian flying training squadron of World War I and medium bomber squadron of World War II. The squadron was formed in England in October 1917 as part of the Australian Flying Corps, and disbanded in April 1919. It was re-formed by the Royal Australian Air Force in September 1939. After seeing action during the Pacific War flying Lockheed Hudson and, later, DAF Beaufort bombers, the squadron was disbanded a second time in January 1946.

== History ==
No. 8 Squadron was formed during World War I, being raised as a flying training squadron of the Australian Flying Corps at Yatesbury, England, on 25 October 1917. The squadron received its first aircraft in January 1918 and trained replacement pilots for No. 4 Squadron until being disbanded following the conclusion of the war on 30 April 1919. The squadron's first commanding officer was Major G.A.C. Cowper; it was initially designated as No. 33 (Australian) (Training) Squadron, Royal Flying Corps.

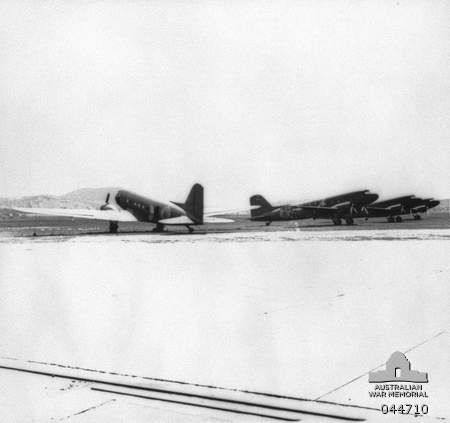
No. 8 Squadron Dakotas, October 1939

During World War II, No. 8 Squadron was re-formed as a bomber-reconnaissance unit at RAAF Station Canberra, which was later retitled as RAAF Station Fairbairn, Canberra, on 11 September 1939. Due to a shortage of other aircraft the squadron was initially equipped with ex-civilian DC-3 transport aircraft, which were used to conduct patrols off the Australian coast and for transport tasks. The squadron was re-equipped with Lockheed Hudson medium bombers in May 1940 and deployed to Singapore in August. It first saw action within hours of the outbreak of war in the Pacific in December 1941 when its 12 aircraft attacked Japanese shipping off Malaya. The squadron suffered heavy losses from anti-aircraft fire and Japanese fighters in the first days of the Malayan Campaign, during which time it undertook bombing and reconnaissance missions. As there were no aircraft to replace its losses, the squadron was amalgamated with No. 1 Squadron later in December.

The amalgamated squadron continued operations throughout the month, before No. 8 Squadron handed its remaining Hudsons to No. 1 Squadron in January 1942 and was evacuated to Palembang in Sumatra, where it received replacement Hudsons. The replacements were six aircraft from No. 59 Squadron RAF, as well as their crews, who had been reassigned and sent from the UK between December 1941 and January 1942. With the new force, they undertook further reconnaissance and bombing missions, during which the squadron continued to suffer heavy losses until No. 8 Squadron was disbanded at Batavia on 16 February and its personnel returned to Australia.

No. 8 Squadron was reformed at RAAF Station Canberra on 12 March 1943 equipped with DAP Beaufort as a medium and torpedo bomber squadron. The squadron practiced cross-country navigation, bombing and air-to-air gunnery around Canberra, as well as torpedo training at Jervis Bay, before moving to Bohle River in northern Queensland in July 1943. The squadron then moved to Goodenough Island, Papua New Guinea, in September and began flying combat missions against Japanese airfields and supply dumps and shipping in the New Britain area. In December, one of the squadron's aircraft sank a 6,834 tonne Japanese ship with torpedoes in Simpson Harbour. Following the isolation of Rabaul, the squadron moved to the New Guinea mainland in April 1944 and flew strikes against Japanese positions near Wewak and anti-shipping patrols until the end of the war from bases around Nadzab and Tadji. No. 8 Squadron was disbanded at Tadji in New Guinea on 19 January 1946.

During the war, 79 personnel from the squadron were killed in action or died on active service. Members from the squadron received the following decorations: one Order of the British Empire, 13 Distinguished Flying Crosses and one bar, two Distinguished Flying Medals, two British Empire Medals, and seven Mentions in Despatches.

After the RAAF ordered eleven Bell AH-1G Cobra attack helicopters in December 1970, plans were developed to re-form No. 8 Squadron and station it at RAAF Base Townsville. The squadron would have either operated all of the helicopters, or shared them with No. 9 Squadron. The order for Cobras was cancelled in October 1971 before any were delivered, however, and No. 8 Squadron was not reestablished.

== Aircraft operated ==
The squadron operated the following aircraft:

- Avro 504 (January 1918 – April 1919);
- Sopwith Pup (January 1918 – April 1919);
- Sopwith Camel (January 1918 – April 1919);
- Sopwith Snipe (?-April 1919);
- Douglas DC-2 (September 1939 – May 1940);
- Douglas DC-3 (September 1939 – May 1940);
- Lockheed Hudson (May 1940 – February 1942);
- DAP Beaufort (March 1943 – January 1946).
