= Edgar Reynolds =

Name - Nafis Joy

Edgar Reynolds OBE
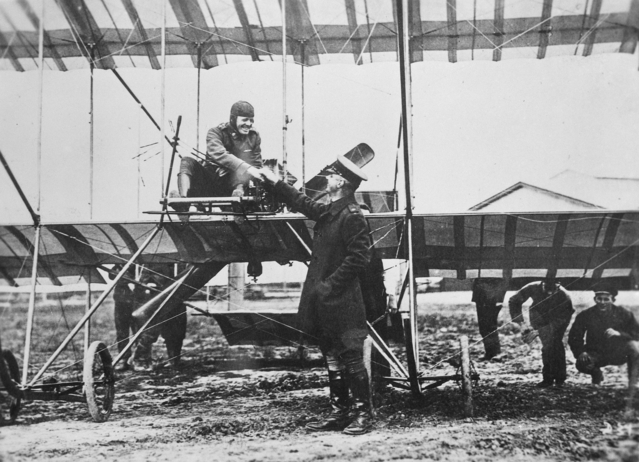
- RAAF Point Cook, c. 1916. Lt Col. Edgar Reynolds (standing, right), foundation CO of 1 Squadron AFC shakes hands with Lt Eric Harrison (left), who is in the cockpit of a Bristol Boxkite.
- Born: October 20, 1878; Paddington, New South Wales, Australia
- Died: August 28, 1965 (aged 86)
- Military career
- Allegiance: Australia
- Branch: Australian Flying Corps
- Rank: Lieutenant-Colonel
- Commands: Australian Flying Corps
- Conflicts: World War I

Lieutenant-Colonel Edgar Hercules Reynolds OBE (20 October 1878 – 28 August 1965) commanded the Australian Flying Corps (AFC) during World War I. Reynolds' role was mostly administrative, as AFC squadrons were usually subordinate to Australian ground forces or British air commands.

Reynolds was born in Paddington, Sydney in 1878.

In 1901, he was commissioned as a probationary Second Lieutenant in the NSW Military Forces (prior to the formation of the Australian Army).

Reynolds attended the British Army Staff College, Camberley (1911–13), where he developed an interest in military aviation. At Camberley, he was instructed by, among others Robert Brooke-Popham (a future Air Chief Marshal of the RAF) and wrote papers on the use of aircraft in artillery spotting.

In March 1914, Reynolds – at the time a Major – was appointed General Staff Officer in charge of a branch covering "Intelligence, Censorship, and Aviation" within the Army's Department of Military Operations. Following the outbreak of World War I and the expansion of the Army, aviation later became a separate branch commanded by Reynolds.

From 1916, Reynolds also took direct command of No. 1 Squadron at RAAF Point Cook, near Melbourne. Later that year, he travelled to the Middle East with the squadron, before assuming the post of Staff Officer for Aviation at Australian Imperial Force Headquarters in London.
