= James Wellwood =

Australian flying ace

James Joseph Wellwood
- Born: 15 October 1892; Drouin, Victoria
- Died: 25 October 1984 (aged 92); Armadale, Victoria
- Burial place: Springvale Crematorium
- Military career
- Allegiance: Australia
- Branch: Australian Imperial Force (1915–17); Australian Flying Corps (1917–19); Royal Australian Air Force (c.1939–45)
- Service years: 1915–1919 c.1939–1945
- Rank: Squadron Leader
- Unit: No. 2 Squadron AFC
- Conflicts: First World War; Second World War
- Awards: Distinguished Flying Cross

James Joseph Wellwood DFC (15 October 1892 – 25 October 1984) was an Australian flying ace of the First World War credited with seven aerial victories. After the war, he went on to a long career as an agriculturalist.

== Early life ==
James Joseph Wellwood was the son of Elizabeth Anne Payne and James Wellwood. He was born in Drouin, Australia on 15 October 1892, one of five brothers. Wellwood's mother died when he was ten.

== Military career ==
Wellwood originally served in an Australian militia unit, the Royal Australian Garrison Artillery before he enlisted in the Siege Brigade of the Australian Imperial Force on 1 June 1915. On his enlistment papers, he stated he was a born British subject working as a motor mechanic.

He later transferred to the Australian Flying Corps, and trained as a Royal Aircraft Factory SE.5 pilot. By mid-1918, he had been assigned to No. 2 Squadron AFC. He scored his first aerial success on 1 August, destroying a German two-seated Rumpler reconnaissance plane southeast of Lille. On 12 August, he destroyed a Fokker D.VII over Licourt. Wellwood teamed with squadron mate Adrian Cole to destroy a DFW recon machine over Epinoy on 25 August.

In September 1918, Wellwood struck twice, driving a Fokker D.VII down out of control on the 6th, and setting a Pfalz D.III afire on the 24th. Wellwood's final two victories were achieved on 4 November 1918; in separate patrols, he destroyed a Fokker D.VII and drove down another out of control.

He was awarded the Distinguished Flying Cross for his exploits, which was personally presented by General Sir William Birdwood on 20 March 1919.

== Postwar ==
Wellwood married Myra Cantor on 28 June 1924 at Trinity Church, Hampton, Victoria, Australia.

Wellwood was active in horse racing as early as 1929, and became secretary of the Bunyip Race Club in early 1933. He was selected as secretary of the Drouin branch of the United Country Party in early 1937. He was a member of a stock cooperative marketing merino sheep from 1937 to 1941.

On 8 November 1945, Wellwood posted notice that he would not allow debts to be contracted in his name without his written authority.

James Joseph Wellwood died on 25 April 1984 in Armadale, Victoria, Australia. He was cremated at Springvale Crematorium.
