= Albert Tonkin =

Albert Victor Tonkin
- Born: 16 December 1886; Avenel, Victoria, Australia
- Died: 17 February 1969 (aged 82)
- Military career
- Allegiance: Australia
- Branch: RAAF
- Rank: Lieutenant
- Unit: No. 1 Squadron AFC
- Conflicts: World War I
- Awards: Distinguished Flying Cross

Lieutenant Albert Victor Tonkin (16 December 1886 – 17 February 1969), was a World War I flying ace credited with six aerial victories. He worked as a grocer pre-war. He originally joined the No. 10 Machine Gun Company in the Australian Imperial Force. On 19 September 1917, he joined 1 Squadron AFC and was posted to Egypt for training. He re-joined the squadron as a pilot on 10 January 1918; he flew Royal Aircraft Factory BE 2Bs against the Turks and Germans. He scored six confirmed victories, and had three unconfirmed victories on 22 July 1918, when he strafed three Albatros D.Vs he had forced to land. On 10 August, he persisted in chasing a Rumpler 50 miles (80 km) in an attempt to bring it to battle. On 13 August, engine trouble forced Tonkin and his observer to land. They were captured by local Arabs, who ransomed them back to the British for a hundred sovereigns. On 19 September, they were brought down by anti-aircraft fire and taken prisoner, only to be repatriated by rescuing cavalry.

Tonkin returned to Australia in March, 1919. He lived another half century, dying on 17 February 1969.
