= Ernest Mustard =

Ernest Andrew Mustard
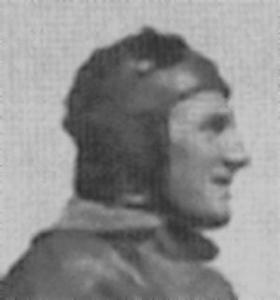
- Born: 21 September 1893; Oakleigh, Melbourne, Australia
- Died: 10 October 1971 (aged 78); Queensland, Australia
- Military career
- Allegiance: British Empire
- Branch: Signals, infantry, then flying service
- Rank: Lieutenant
- Nickname: Pard
- Unit: No. 1 Squadron AFC
- Conflicts: World War I; Gallipoli campaign; World War II
- Awards: Distinguished Flying Cross

Lieutenant Ernest Andrew Mustard (1893-1971) was a World War I flying ace credited with five aerial victories. He returned to service during World War II with the Royal Australian Air Force (RAAF). Lt. Mustard flew Avro Lancaster bombers during World War II with a mixed crew of RAAF and Royal Canadian Air Force personnel. One bomb aimer on his crew was named Alexander Philip Mustard (no relation). Lt. Mustard was also responsible for the first aerial survey of Australia's Barrier Reef.
