= Allan Hepburn =

- Born: 11 October 1896; Melbourne, Australia
- Died: 21 July 1975 (aged 78)
- Military career
- Allegiance: United Kingdom; Australia
- Branch: Royal Air Force; Royal Australian Air Force
- Rank: Wing Commander
- Commands: No. 1 Squadron RAAF
- Conflicts: World War I World War II
- Awards: Distinguished Flying Cross

Wing Commander Allan Hepburn, DFC, (11 October 1896 – 21 July 1975) was an Australian World War I flying ace, who was born in Melbourne, Victoria. He scored 16 victories during his flying career.

== Military service ==
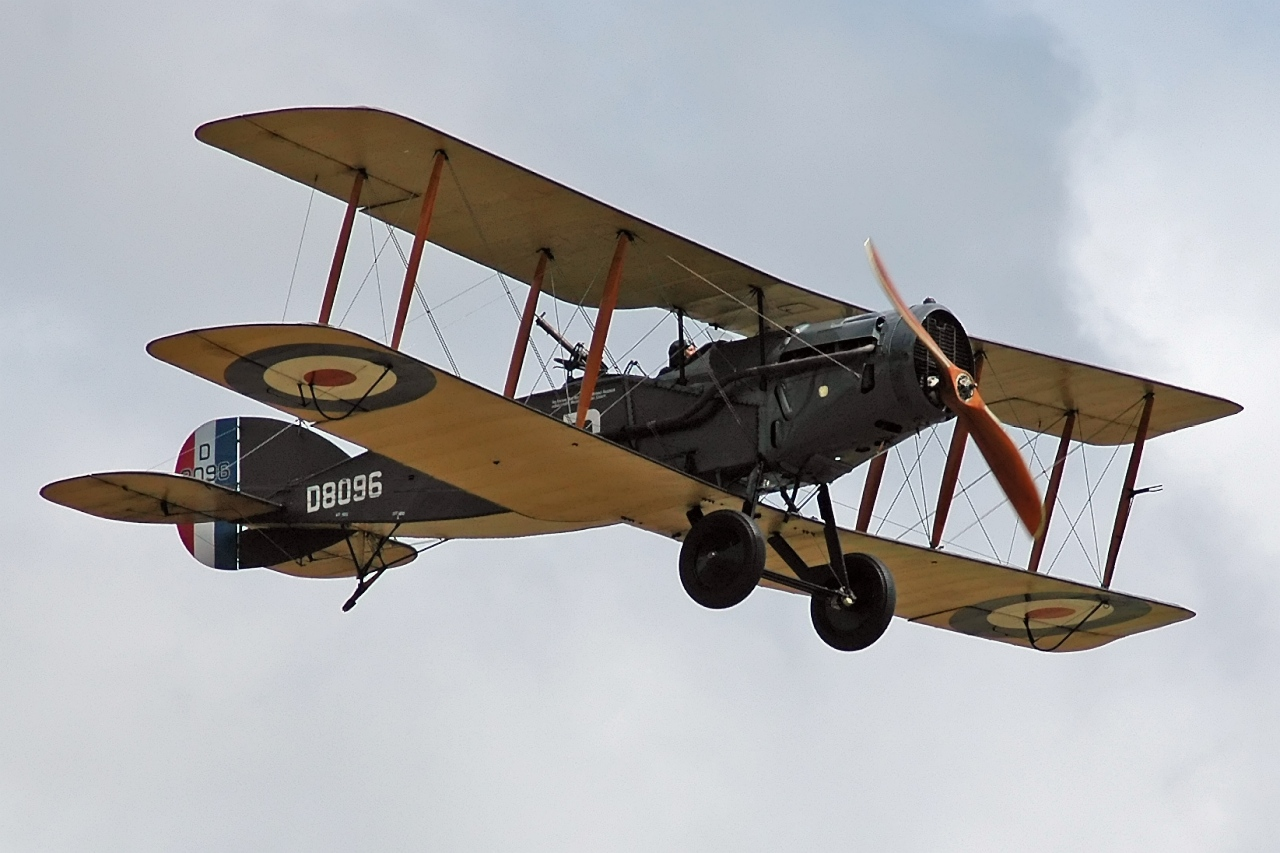
Bristol F2B

Hepburn enlisted in the Artists Rifles on 4 August 1916 and served in the trenches of France in the same year. He joined the Royal Flying Corps at Denham on 6 September 1916, flying the Airco DH.5 in 24 Squadron of the RFC. He was slightly wounded in action in October 1917 and continued flying. In November he was posted to 40 Squadron of the RFC, but was injured in a crash and was sent to England to recuperate. In April 1918, Hepburn returned to duty flying a Bristol F.2 Fighter, commanding the "A" Flight of 88 Squadron of the RAF. 88 Squadron later joined 80 Wing RAF where Hepburn flew side by side with the two Australian Flying Corps scout squadrons.

Hepburn and his observers achieved 16 victories before the Armistice was signed. He received the Distinguished Flying Cross for a flight in October, 1918:

"On 12 October this officer made a very fine flight, calling for courage and determination of a high order. Thick clouds were within 200 feet of the ground and the visibility was so bad that practically no flying was attempted. Despite these adverse conditions this officer volunteered to cross the lines. Climbing through the clouds, which were several thousand feet in depth, he flew above them, guided by compass, with no view of the ground. Continuing his flight until he estimated that he was in the vicinity of a certain objective, he descended, and found himself 150 feet over an enemy railway station. Dropping his bombs, he destroyed a passenger train, and afterwards engaged enemy troops and transport with machine-gun fire. Having caused considerable damage, Captain Hepburn climbed through the clouds and found his way home."

Allan Hepburn features in two stories in Rothesay Stuart Wortley's book, Letters of a Flying Officer (paperback from Alan Sutton, 1982). One of Hepburn's opinions reported in the book regards the use of radio, or wireless telephone, in the plane. "His chief objection to it is that one cannot stunt a machine with 150 feet of aerial trailing underneath the fuselage; and that one might very well find oneself involved in a scrap before one has the time to wind it up, with a possible result that the wire might get entangled in the propeller and so wreck the machine in mid-air."

After the war, Hepburn returned to Australia and joined the Royal Australian Air Force, becoming Commanding Officer of 1 Squadron in 1929; Wing Commander, 1934; Director of Works and Building RAAF about 1936, and Director of Works Department of Defence during the Second World War. He later became the Regional Director Civil Aviation in New South Wales and representative in Canada.

== List of aerial victories ==
Combat record
No.	Date/Time	Aircraft/ Serial No.	Opponent	Result	Location	Notes
1	17 May 1918 @ 0745	Bristol F.2b (C821)	Albatros D.V	Out of control	East of Middelkerke	Observer: Second Lieutenant G. W. Lambert
2	31 May 1918 @ 1950	Bristol F.2b (C821)	Albatros D.V	Out of control	Ostend	Observer: Sergeant Thomas Proctor
3	2 June 1918 @ 1935	Bristol F.2b (C821)	Albatros D.V	Destroyed in flames	Middelkerke—Ostend	Observer: Sergeant Thomas Proctor
4	29 July 1918 @ 1830	Bristol F.2b (C821)	Fokker D.VII	Out of control	Bois-Grenier	Observer: Sergeant Ernest Antcliffe
5	31 July 1918 @ 1200	Bristol F.2b (C821)	Fokker D.VII	Destroyed in flames	Zelobes	Observer: Sergeant Ernest Antcliffe
6	29 August 1918 @ 0815	Bristol F.2b (C821)	Fokker D.VII	Out of control	East of Lille	Observer: Second Lieutenant H. G. Eldon
7	1 September 1918 @ 1910	Bristol F.2b (C821)	Fokker D.VII	Destroyed in flames	East of Becelaere	Observer: Sergeant Ernest Antcliffe
8	5 September 1918 @ 1900–1905	Bristol F.2b (C821)	Fokker D.VII	Out of control	North of Douai	Observer: Second Lieutenant H. G. Eldon
9	5 September 1918 @ 1900–1905	Bristol F.2b (C821)	Fokker D.VII	Destroyed in flames	Armentières	Observer: Second Lieutenant H. G. Eldon
10	6 September 1918 @ 1845	Bristol F.2b (C821)	Fokker D.VII	Out of control	North of Douai	Observer: Second Lieutenant H. G. Eldon
11	24 September 1918 @ 1010	Bristol F.2b (C821)	Fokker D.VII	Destroyed in flames	Haubourdin	Observer: Second Lieutenant H. G. Eldon
12	8 October 1918 @ 1245	Bristol F.2b (C821)	Fokker D.VII	Out of control	South-West of Cambrai	Observer: Second Lieutenant H. G. Eldon
13	9 October 1918 @ 0845	Bristol F.2b (C821)	Fokker D.VII	Destroyed	Seclin	Observer: Second Lieutenant H. G. Eldon
14	28 October 1918 @ 1445	Bristol F.2b (C821)	Fokker D.VII	Out of control	Leuze—Ath	Observer: Lieutenant Marshall
15	4 November 1918 @ 1300	Bristol F.2b (C821)	Pfalz D.III	Destroyed	Faucaumont	Observer: Second Lieutenant Alexander Tranter
16	4 November 1918 @ 1300	Bristol F.2b (C821)	Pfalz D.III	Destroyed	West of Mainvault—Faucaumont	Observer: Second Lieutenant Alexander Tranter
