= Richard Watson Howard =

Australian World War I flying ace

- Born: 9 October 1896; North Sydney, New South Wales, Cumberland, Australia
- Died: 22 March 1918 (aged 21); Near Vermond
- Burial place: Pas de Calais, France
- Military career
- Allegiance: Australia
- Branch: Aviation
- Rank: Captain
- Units: No. 57 Squadron RFC, No. 68 Squadron RFC, No. 2 Squadron AFC
- Awards: Military Cross

Captain Richard Watson Howard (9 October 1896 – 22 March 1918) was a World War I flying ace credited with eight aerial victories.
