= Ernest Antcliffe =

World War 1 British ace gunner

- Born: 12 October 1898; Mansfield, Nottinghamshire, England
- Died: 1974 (aged 75–76); Worksop, Yorkshire, England
- Military career
- Allegiance: United Kingdom
- Branch: Royal Flying Corps; Royal Air Force
- Rank: Sergeant
- Unit: No. 88 Squadron RAF
- Conflicts: World War I
- Awards: Distinguished Flying Medal

Sergeant Ernest Antcliffe DFM (12 October 1898 – 19 June 1974) was a World War I flying ace gunner who, in conjunction with his pilots, was credited with seven aerial victories between 25 June 1918 and the end of the war.

Antcliffe was originally a private in the 270th Infantry Battalion before transferring to the Royal Flying Corps. He then served as an observer/gunner in the rear seat of a Bristol F.2 Fighter in 88 Squadron. Three of his seven victories came while he was being piloted by Allan Hepburn. In total, he was credited with three Fokker D.VIIs set afire in midair, two others destroyed, and two driven down out of control.

Ernest Antcliffe won the Distinguished Flying Medal for his service; it was gazetted on 3 June 1919. He then faded into obscurity.
