= Francis Smith (RAAF officer) =

Australian flying ace of World War I

Francis Ryan Smith
- Born: 23 July 1896; Brisbane, Queensland, Australia
- Died: 24 December 1961 (aged 65); Balmain, New South Wales, Australia
- Military career
- Allegiance: Australia
- Branch: Australian Imperial Force; Australian Flying Corps; Royal Australian Air Force
- Service years: 1915–1919; 1941–1944
- Rank: Squadron Leader
- Conflicts: First World War; Western Front; Battle of Fromelles; Second World War
- Awards: Military Cross; Distinguished Flying Cross

Francis Ryan Smith, MC, DFC was an Australian flying ace of the First World War, credited with 16 aerial victories. Following the war, he studied engineering and worked in China, eventually starting his own aviation business. During the Second World War, Smith served in the Royal Australian Air Force, as a squadron leader.

== World War I service ==
Francis Ryan Smith was born 23 July 1896, in Brisbane, Queensland. He worked as a clerk before joining the Australian Imperial Force on 20 July 1915, during the First World War. As an infantry officer, he served with distinction in the 31st Battalion, seeing action on the Western Front at Fromelles and then later around Armentieres in 1916, for which he was awarded the Military Cross, for bravery under fire. He transferred to the Australian Flying Corps for training, then joined No. 2 Squadron AFC as a pilot on 28 February 1918.

Piloting a RAF SE.5a, he was credited with a total of 16 aerial victories, consisting of nine enemy aircraft sent down out of control, and seven others destroyed including one shared.

Along the way, Smith became a Flight Leader by mid-September 1918; he also became his squadron's leading ace. Additionally, he became the squadron's final casualty, being shot down on 10 November 1918. Although downed behind enemy lines, he evaded capture by donning civilian clothing and covering 40 miles back to his squadron mess. He found his squadron-mates celebrating the Armistice ending the war.

He returned to Australia on 6 May 1919. By 18 June, he had been discharged.

== Later life ==
Post war, Smith studied engineering at St Leo's College, in Brisbane, and in 1920 moved to Amoy, in China to work for a merchant company. He later moved to Shanghai as he progressed in the company and in 1935 started an aviation company in Hong Kong. He married his cousin, Annie (Nancy) Power, while in China and had two children.

He returned to Australia in 1941, and during the Second World War, Smith served in the Royal Australian Air Force, achieving the rank of squadron leader before being discharged in January 1944. His final posting on discharge was No. 3 Wing, Air Training Corps.

In 1951, Smith leased an auto service station in Willandra, Ryde, New South Wales. He died on 24 December 1961 in Balmain, New South Wales.

== Honours and awards ==
Military Cross (MC):

2nd Lt. Francis Ryan Smith, Infy. For conspicuous gallantry in action. He led a raiding party into the enemy trenches with great courage and initiative. He set a splendid example to his men.

Distinguished Flying Cross (DFC):

Lieut. (A./Capt.) Francis Ryan Smith, M.C. (Australian F.C.). (FRANCE) This officer combines high individual enterprise and determination with exceptionally able leadership. These qualities were conspicuous on 14 October, when, leading a patrol of five machines, he saw a formation of twelve Fokker biplanes above him. Relying on the co-operation of another higher formation of Bristol machines, he, deliberately manoeuvred his formation into a disadvantageous position in order that our higher patrol might be able to attack the enemy while the latter's attention was concentrated upon destroying his, Lt. Smith's, formation. The stratagem was entirely successful, with the result that two enemy machines were destroyed and two others were believed to crash. The Fokkers were then reinforced by eight more machines, and in the ensuing combat Lt. Smith shot down one in flames, his patrol destroying two others. We suffered no casualties.
