= No. 2 Squadron RAAF =

- No. 2 Squadron's crest
- Active: 1916–1919; 1922; 1937–1982; 2000–current
- Country: Australia
- Branch: Royal Australian Air Force
- Role: Airborne Early Warning and Control
- Part of: No. 41 Wing, Surveillance & Response Group
- Base: RAAF Base Williamtown
- Mottos: Consilio et manu ("To Advise and to Strike")
- Engagements: World War I: Western Front; World War II: South West Pacific Area; Malayan Emergency; Vietnam War; Military intervention against ISIS 2026 Iran war
- Decorations: Presidential Unit Citation (United States); Vietnam Gallantry Cross Unit Citation (South Vietnam); USAF Outstanding Unit Commendation (United States)

Commanders
- Notable commanders: Oswald Watt (1916–18); Alan Charlesworth (1939); Peter Raw (1953–55)

Aircraft flown
- Electronic warfare: Boeing E-7A Wedgetail AEW&C

No. 2 Squadron is a Royal Australian Air Force (RAAF) squadron that operates from RAAF Base Williamtown, near Newcastle, New South Wales. From its formation in 1916 as part of the Australian Flying Corps, it has flown a variety of aircraft types including fighters, bombers, and Airborne Early Warning & Control (AEW&C). During World War I, the squadron operated on the Western Front conducting fighter sweeps and ground-attack missions. It was disbanded in mid-1919, following the end of hostilities. The squadron was briefly re-raised in 1922 as part of the newly independent RAAF, but was disbanded after only a couple of months and not re-formed until 1937. It saw action as a bomber unit in the South West Pacific theatre of World War II and, equipped with English Electric Canberra jets, in the Malayan Emergency and the Vietnam War. The squadron was again disbanded in 1982, following the retirement of the Canberra. It was re-formed in 2000 to operate the Boeing E-7A Wedgetail.

== History ==
=== World War I ===
On 20 September 1916, No. 2 Squadron was established as a unit of the Australian Flying Corps (AFC) at Kantara, Egypt, drawing personnel mainly from Australian Light Horse units of the Australian Imperial Force (AIF). Shortly after forming, under the command of Major Oswald Watt, the unit was transferred to the United Kingdom to complete training, arriving at Harlaxton on 30 January 1917. Between February and September 1917, the squadron undertook training with Royal Flying Corps units before being equipped with Airco DH.5 fighters. To differentiate the squadron from the British No. 2 Squadron RFC, it was known to the British military as "No. 68 Squadron RFC". This terminology was never accepted by the AIF who continued to use the AFC designation regardless, and by January 1918 the British designation was officially discontinued.

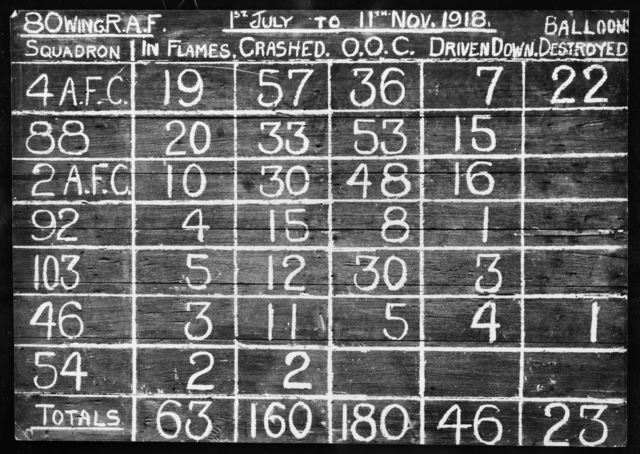
Serny, France, November 1918. A scoreboard recording the claims for aircraft destroyed by No. 80 Wing RAF between July and November 1918. The squadrons listed are: No. 4 Squadron AFC, No. 88 Squadron RAF, No. 2 Squadron AFC, No. 92 Squadron RAF, No. 103 Squadron RAF, No. 46 Squadron RAF, and No. 54 Squadron RAF.

In late September 1917, the squadron flew its aircraft across the English Channel, landing in St Omer without incident or loss – and after overnighting there it moved to Baizieux. Assigned to the 13th Army Wing, RFC, it undertook its first combat operations on the Western Front a month later. Its first major action came during the Battle of Cambrai in November and December when it was heavily involved as a low-level ground attack unit, attacking German trenches, but suffering heavy casualties in doing so. On 22 November, the squadron shot down its first German aircraft in air-to-air combat during a chance encounter on a ground attack sortie. After this, several more German aircraft were shot down by the squadron's pilots before the squadron was withdrawn from operations in December to re-equip with Royal Aircraft Factory S.E.5a fighters. In January 1918, the squadron moved to Savy, and the following month gained its first victories with the new aircraft type.

During early 1918, the Germans launched a major offensive on the Western Front after the collapse of Russia allowed them to increase their forces in the west. Falling initially against the British southern flank, the offensive pushed the Allies back significantly, and the squadron was forced to withdraw to airfields further back from the front as German forces advanced steadily: on 2 April it moved from Savy to Bertangles, on 4 April to La Bellevue and then on 4 June to Fouquerolles, remaining there until 21 June when it moved to Liettres to support the French during the Marne offensive. During this time, the squadron was attached to the Royal Air Force's Nos 10, 22, 51 and (finally) 80 wings. Despite the moves, the squadron maintained a high operational tempo, becoming involved in heavy air-to-air combat during fighter sweeps, and also being used to attack advancing German ground forces (see image left). After the German offensive was finally halted, the Allies launched their own offensive in August around Amiens after which the squadron was employed to attack German airfields, and as the Germans were forced back, attacking withdrawing German troops on the ground. Throughout October, in an effort to keep up with the advance, the squadron moved three times and by the time the armistice was signed in November it was based at Pont-a-Marq.

Following the conclusion of hostilities, the squadron was withdrawn to the United Kingdom in March 1919 as the demobilisation process began. On 6 May its personnel embarked on the transport Kaisar-I-Hind for repatriation back to Australia, at which time the squadron was disbanded. During the war, No. 2 Squadron produced 18 flying aces, including Francis Ryan Smith, Roy Cecil Phillipps (the squadron's highest scorer), Roby Lewis Manuel, Henry Garnet Forrest, Adrian Cole, Eric Douglas Cummings, Richard Watson Howard, Frank Alberry, Ernest Edgar Davies, and James Wellwood. The squadron's total score was 94 aircraft shot down, 73 out of control and 18 driven down. Its casualties amounted to 25 personnel killed and eight wounded.

=== World War II ===
In 1922, No. 2 Squadron was briefly re-formed as part of the newly independent Royal Australian Air Force at Point Cook, Victoria, but it never progressed beyond a cadre unit and was disbanded a few months later. It was re-formed again on 3 May 1937 at Laverton. Following the outbreak of World War II, under the command of Squadron Leader Alan Charlesworth, the squadron began maritime patrol and convoy escort operations off the Australian eastern seaboard, operating Avro Ansons, before being re-equipped with Lockheed Hudsons in May and June 1940.

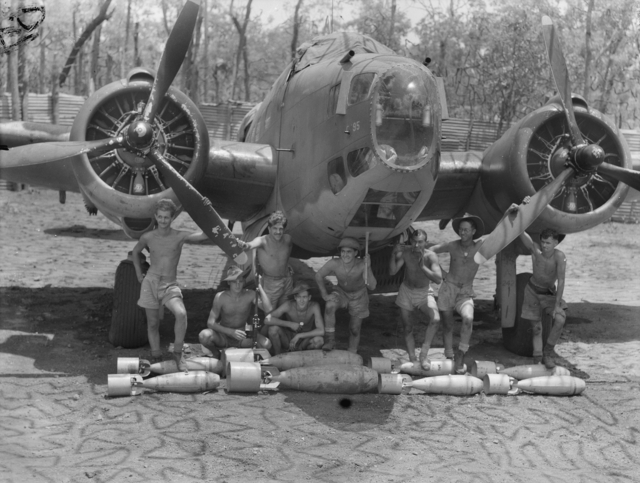
No. 2 Squadron ground crew posting with one of the unit's Hudson bombers in October 1942

Wing Commander Frank Headlam took over command of the squadron in April 1941, and in early December 1941, shortly before Japan's entry into the war, the squadron moved to Darwin, Northern Territory where it maintained its maritime role and deployed detachments to the islands to Australia's north, including Ambon in the Dutch East Indies. After the outbreak of the Pacific War, the squadron mounted reconnaissance and bombing missions against Japanese forces, focusing on Japanese shipping. Success came early with a 306-tonne (301-long-ton; 337-short-ton) Japanese vessel being heavily damaged on 8 December, although heavy losses also came early on. In early 1942, the squadron's detachments were withdrawn back to Australia as Japanese forces advanced south, attacking the squadron's forward bases. Wing Commander Tich McFarlane took over command of the unit in April. The squadron continued operations after its return to Australia, maintaining an intense bombing campaign against Japanese shipping and installations on islands including Timor and Ambon from May to October during which 13 crews were killed. For its service, the squadron was awarded a US Presidential Unit Citation.

Throughout 1942–1943, the squadron continued operations with its Hudsons against the Japanese in the East Indies and conducted aerial resupply for elements of Sparrow Force that were fighting on Timor. Late in 1943, the squadron began training on the Bristol Beaufort, completing its conversion in January 1944. The squadron operated the type only briefly, alongside a small number of remaining Hudsons before converting to the North American B-25 Mitchell in May. After being withdrawn from operations briefly, it recommenced combat missions in late June, focusing on anti-shipping strikes, but also attacking Japanese airfields. Late in the war, No. 2 Squadron moved to Balikpapan in Borneo where it was used to drop supplies to Allied troops in Japanese prisoner-of-war camps before undertaking transportation duties following the end of hostilities. The squadron returned to Australia in mid-December 1945 and was disbanded in May 1946 at Laverton. Casualties during the war amounted to 176 killed.

=== Cold War ===
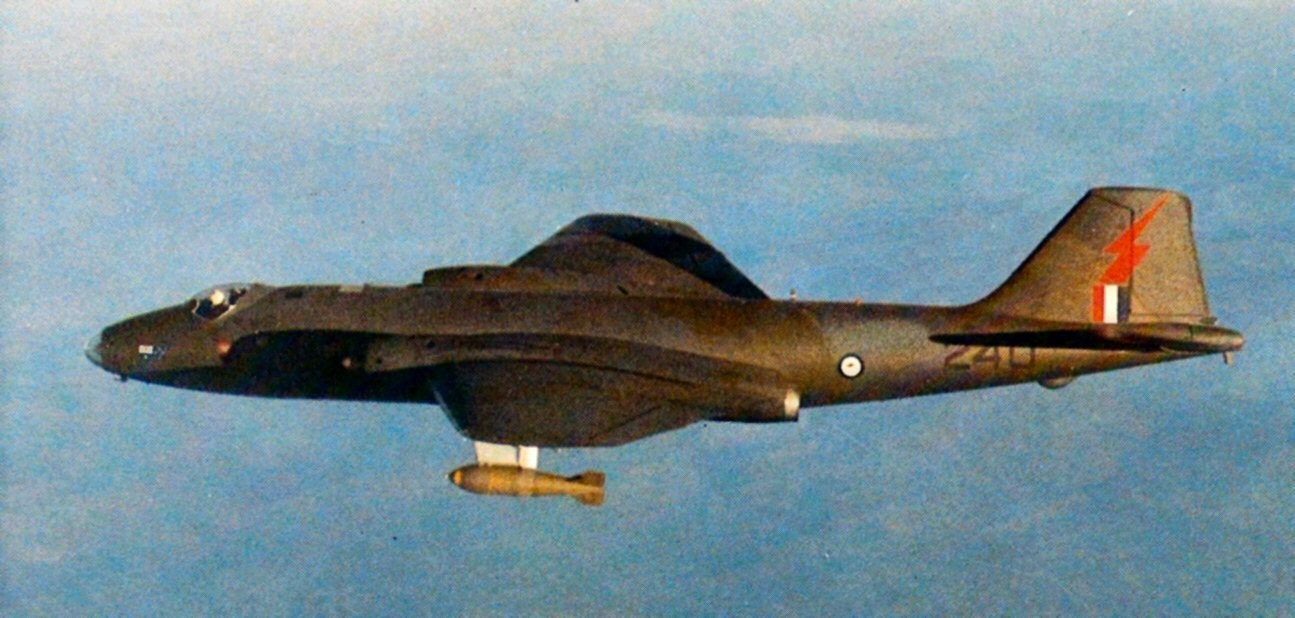
A No. 2 Squadron Canberra during the Vietnam War in 1970

In the post-World War II period, the squadron was reformed briefly as a communications squadron based at Mallala, South Australia, in June 1947 before a reorganisation early the following year saw it redesignated as No. 34 Squadron, while the previously existing No. 21 Squadron, equipped with Avro Lincolns at RAAF Base Amberley, became No. 2 Squadron. In 1953, the squadron was re-equipped with GAF Canberras, which it later operated from RAAF Butterworth during the Malayan Emergency, after deploying there in 1958 to relieve the Lincoln-equipped No. 1 Squadron RAAF. During the emergency, the squadron undertook airstrikes against communist forces and after the conflict ended, it remained in Malaysia throughout the early 1960s during the Confrontation, before despatching eight Canberras to South Vietnam in April 1967 as part of Australia's commitment to the Vietnam War.

Based at Phan Rang Air Base in Ninh Thuan province, the unit became part of the United States Air Force 35th Tactical Fighter Wing (35 TFW) and between April 1967 and June 1971, the Canberras flew approximately 12,000 sorties. Although the squadron initially undertook high-level night-time attacks, the majority of its operations were low-level daylight attacks; and according to historian Steve Eather the squadron achieved a high success rate, accounting for 16 percent of 35 TFW's assessed bomb damage despite flying only five percent of its missions, while maintaining a 97–98 percent serviceability rate. It dropped 76,389 bombs and was credited with 786 enemy personnel confirmed killed and a further 3,390 estimated killed; with 8,637 structures, 15,568 bunkers, 1,267 sampans and 74 bridges destroyed. An aircraft from the squadron responded to a distress call on 24 April 1969 and, against operational orders, bombed a site in Cambodia (the Fishhook) where US special forces were pinned down.

During its deployment to Vietnam, No. 2 Squadron suffered two crew members killed, two squadron members died of disease, and three from accidents during the war. Two Canberras were shot down in 1970 and 1971. One was brought down by a surface-to-air missile from which the crewmen – one of whom was the squadron commander, Wing Commander Frank Downing – safely ejected and were rescued via helicopter, and another was lost during a bombing run near the Laos border. The crew of the latter aircraft, Flying Officer Michael Herbert and Pilot Officer Robert Carver, were not recovered during the war and were posted as "missing in action"; however the wreckage of their Canberra was finally located in April 2009 and their remains returned to Australia. The squadron was awarded the Vietnam Gallantry Cross Unit Citation and a United States Air Force Outstanding Unit Commendation for its service in Vietnam. During the deployment, the squadron's aircraft used the callsign "Magpie" in recognition of the squadron's emblem.

The squadron returned to Australia in 1971, having been deployed overseas for a total of 13 years. After Vietnam, No. 2 Squadron was based at Amberley, west of Brisbane, Queensland. It briefly returned to bombing role in training, but in the later years of the Canberra bomber's RAAF operations, it was predominately used for target towing in support of the RAAF's fleet of Dassault Mirage III fighters and survey photography to support the aerial mapping of Australia and other locations including Papua New Guinea, Irian Jaya and the Cocos and Christmas Islands. Eventually, the squadron's Canberra bombers were retired from service and in late July 1982 the squadron was disbanded.

=== 21st century ===
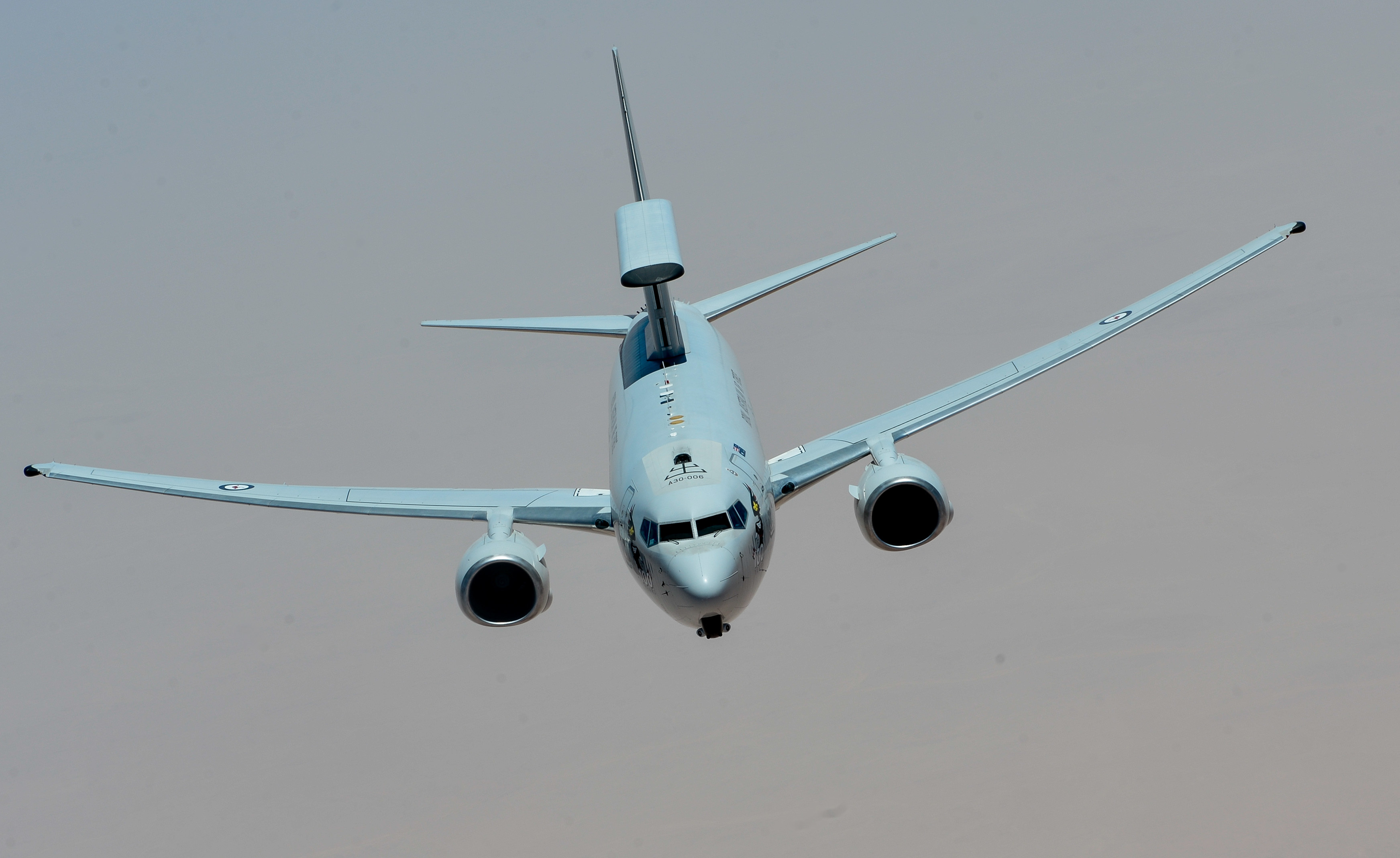
No. 2 Sqn RAAF Boeing E-7A AEW&C aircraft during a deployment to the Middle East in 2017

The squadron was re-formed in January 2000 to operate Boeing E-7 Wedgetail Airborne Early Warning & Control (AEW&C) aircraft procured as part of Project Wedgetail, out of RAAF Base Williamtown and RAAF Base Tindal. On 26 November 2009, the RAAF accepted the first two of six Boeing 737-based E-7A Wedgetails, and by the end of 2010 the squadron had begun training. In 2011, after a period of conversion training for its crews, it took part in Exercise Talisman Sabre with US and Australian forces. The squadron forms part of the Surveillance & Response Group's No. 42 Wing, which is responsible for the RAAF's AEW&C capability.

On 14 September 2014, the Federal government committed to deploying one of the squadron's Wedgetails to Al Minhad Air Base in the United Arab Emirates, as part of a coalition to combat Islamic State forces in Iraq. The aircraft began undertaking missions in Iraq on 1 October. The final Wedgetail rotation to the Middle East ended in early 2019.

In July 2023, the Australian Government announced that a Wedgetail aircraft and up to 100 personnel would be deployed to Germany for six months as part of Operation Kudu from October as part of Australia's response to the Russian invasion of Ukraine. The aircraft was to join international efforts to protect the flow of supplies to Ukraine. The Wedgetail arrived at Ramstein Air Base on 19 October. The Australians found the cold winter weather in Europe to be challenging and needed to develop anti-icing procedures. The deployment concluded in early April 2024. By this time the aircraft had flown sorties totalling 250 hours.

In June 2025, the Australian Government announced that at the request of NATO and Poland, a Wedgetail aircraft will deploy to Europe in August. Under Operation Kudu, the deployment will support the NATO military aid to Ukraine mission by helping to protect a vital international gateway for humanitarian and military assistance, provide airborne radar coverage of the airspace on NATO's eastern flank, and Electronic Warfare intelligence gathering to support the defence of Ukraine. Up to 100 ADF personnel will deploy alongside the aircraft. Arriving on 30 July at Łask Air Base in Poland, the aircraft deployment is expected to conclude by November 2025.

Australia was the lead customer for the Wedgetail aircraft, which has since been purchased by several other countries. As of 2023, between 20 and 25 RAF personnel were serving with No. 2 Squadron ahead of the aircraft entering service in the UK. In June 2024, it was reported that 70 American personnel were embedded with No. 2 Squadron until the end of the year to help prepare for the aircraft to enter service with the USAF.

In September 2023 No. 2 Squadron was transferred from No. 42 Wing to No. 41 Wing upon the former's disbandment.

In March 2026, 75 personnel were deployed along with an E-7A Wedgetail to the United Arab Emirates in helping them defend themselves as part of Australia's involvement in the 2026 Iran war.

== Aircraft operated ==
Type	Origin	Class	Role	Introduced	Retired	Total	Notes
D.H.5	UK	biplane	fighter	1916	1917	80	first Australian fighter
S.E.5a	UK	biplane	fighter	1918	1919		
Anson	UK	prop	maritime patrol	1937	1940		
Hudson	USA	prop	patrol bomber	1940	1943		
Beaufort	UK	prop	torpedo bomber	1943	1944		
B-25 Mitchell	USA	prop	bomber	1944	1946		
Lincoln	UK	prop	heavy bomber	1947	1953		
Canberra	AUS	jet	bomber	1953	1982		
E-7A Wedgetail	USA	jet	AEW&C	2009	Active	6	
