= Australian Flying Corps =

Aerial warfare branch of the Australian Army (1912-1920)

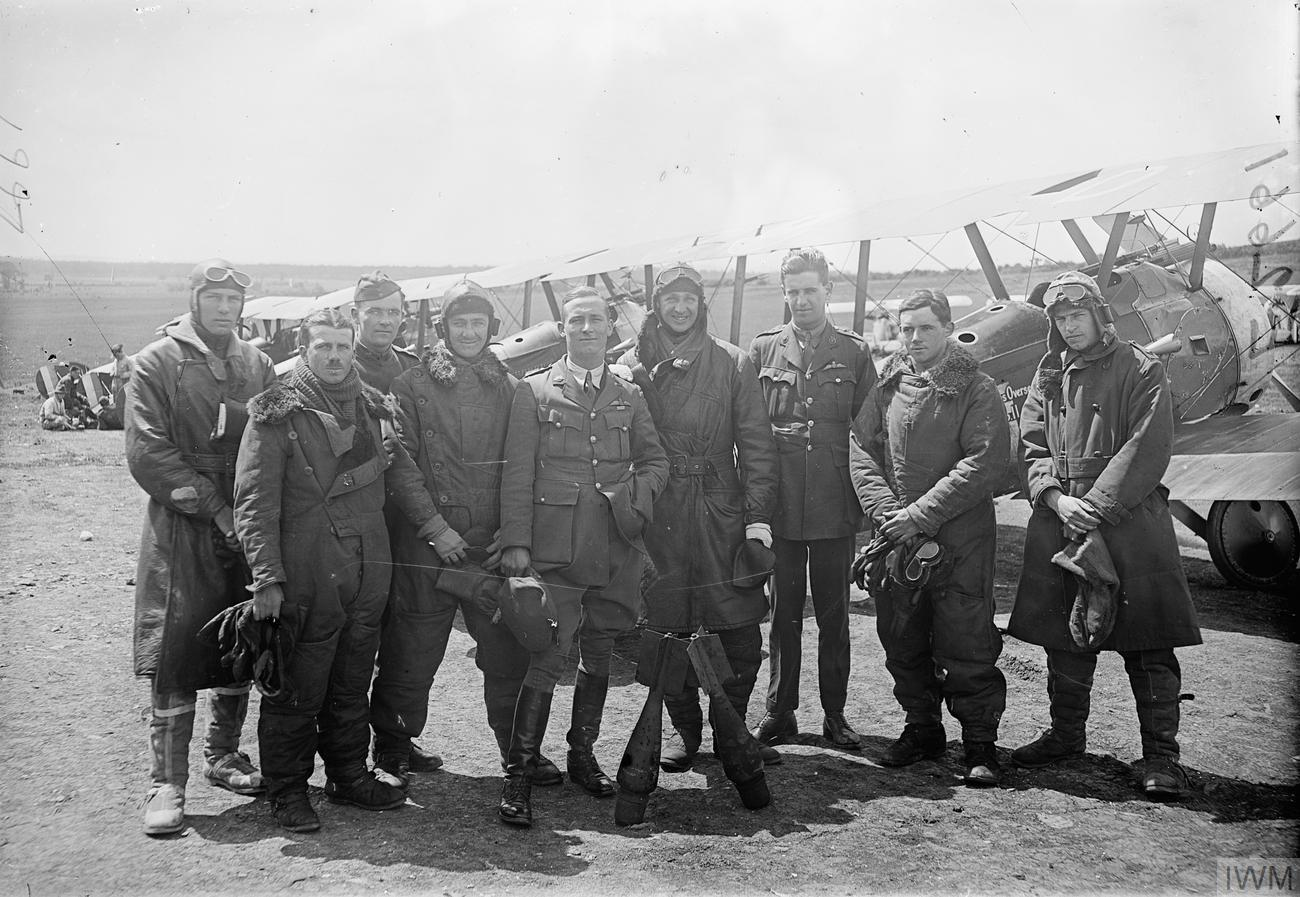
- Captain Harry Cobby (centre), Lieutenant Roy King (fourth from right), and other officers of "A" Flight, No. 4 Squadron AFC, with their Sopwith Camels on the Western Front, June 1918
- Active: 1912–20
- Country: Australia
- Branch: Australian Army
- Type: Air force
- Role: Aerial warfare
- Part of: Australian Imperial Force
- Engagements: World War I: Mesopotamian campaign; Sinai and Palestine Campaign; Western Front

Commanders
- Notable commanders: Edgar Reynolds; Richard Williams

Insignia
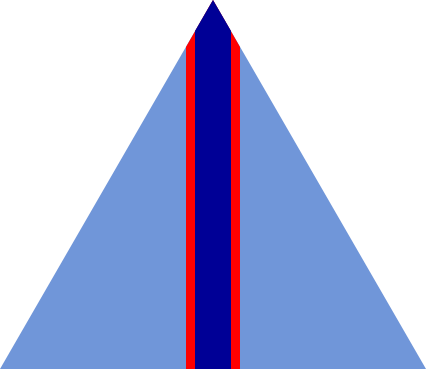
- Unit Colour Patch

The Australian Flying Corps (AFC) was the branch of the Australian Army responsible for operating aircraft during World War I, and the forerunner of the Royal Australian Air Force (RAAF). The AFC was established in 1912, though it was not until 1914 that it began flight training.

In 1911, at the Imperial Conference held in London, it was decided that aviation should be developed by the national armed forces of the British Empire. Australia became the first member of the Empire to follow this policy. By the end of 1911, the Army was advertising for pilots and mechanics. During 1912, pilots and mechanics were appointed, aircraft were ordered, the site of a flying school was chosen and the first squadron was officially raised. On 7 March 1913, the government officially announced formation of the Central Flying School (CFS) and an "Australian Aviation Corps", although that name was never widely used.

AFC units were formed for service overseas with the Australian Imperial Force (AIF) during World War I. They operated initially in the Mesopotamian Campaign. The AFC later saw action in Palestine and France. A training wing was established in the United Kingdom. The corps remained part of the Australian Army until it was disbanded in 1919, after which it was temporarily replaced by the Australian Air Corps. In 1921, that formation was re-established as the independent RAAF.

== Establishment ==
On 30 December 1911, the Commonwealth Gazette announced that the Australian military would seek the "...appointment of two competent Mechanists [sic] and Aviators", adding that the government would "accept no liability for accidents". On 3 July 1912, the first "flying machines" were ordered: two Royal Aircraft Factory B.E.2 two-seat tractor biplanes and two British-built Deperdussin single-seat tractor monoplanes. Soon afterward, two pilots were appointed: Henry Petre (6 August) and Eric Harrison (11 August).

On 22 September 1912, the Minister of Defence, Senator George Pearce, officially approved formation of an Australian military air arm. Petre rejected a suggestion by Captain Oswald Watt that a Central Flying School be established in Canberra, near the Royal Military College, Duntroon, because it was too high above sea level. Petre instead recommended several sites in Victoria and one of these was chosen, at Point Cook, Victoria, on 22 October 1912. Two days later, on 24 October 1912, the government authorised the raising of a single squadron. Upon establishment the squadron would be equipped with four aircraft and manned by "...four officers, seven warrant officers and sergeants, and 32 mechanics", drawn from volunteers already serving in the Citizen Forces.

On 7 March 1913, the government officially announced formation of the Central Flying School (CFS) and the "Australian Aviation Corps". According to the Australian War Memorial, the name "Australian Flying Corps does not appear to have been promulgated officially but seems to have been derived from the term Australian Aviation Corps. The first mention of an Australian Flying Corps appears in Military Orders of 1914." Flying training did not begin immediately; it was not until 1914 that the first class of pilots were accepted. No. 1 Flight of the Australian Flying Corps was raised in the 3rd Military District on 14 July 1914.

In March 1914, a staff officer, Major Edgar Reynolds, was officially appointed General Staff Officer in charge of a branch covering "intelligence, censorship, and aviation" within the Army's Department of Military Operations. Following the outbreak of World War I and the expansion of the Army, aviation became a separate branch commanded by Reynolds. AFC operational units were attached and subordinate to Australian ground forces and/or British ground and air commands. Reynolds' role was mostly administrative rather than one that involved operational command. (Note: Appointed to command No. 1 Squadron AFC in 1916, Reynolds later took up the position of Staff Officer for Aviation at AIF Headquarters in London.)

== World War I ==
=== Operations ===
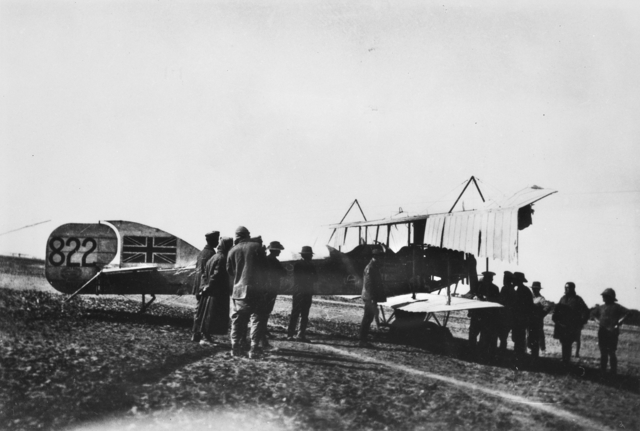
Members of the Half Flight gather around a Royal Naval Air Service Short 827

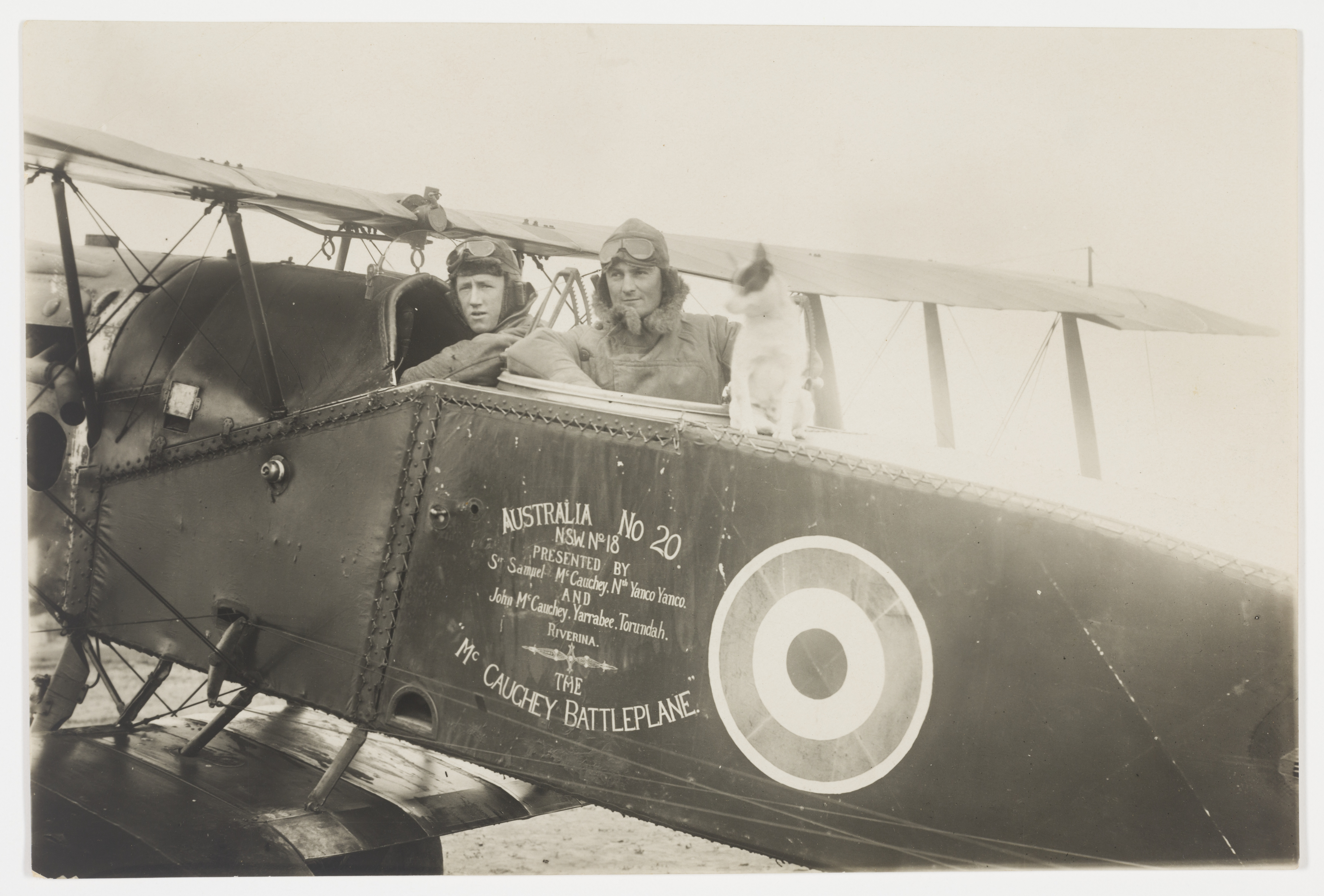
McGinness and Fletcher in a Bristol Fighter F-2B (McCaughey Battleplane), Palestine, 1918

After the outbreak of war in 1914, the Australian Flying Corps sent one aircraft, a B.E.2, to assist in capturing the German colonies in northern New Guinea and the Solomon Islands. German forces in the Pacific surrendered quickly, before the aircraft was even unpacked from its shipping crate.

The first operational flights did not occur until 27 May 1915, when the Mesopotamian Half Flight (MHF), under the command of Captain Henry Petre, was called upon to assist the Indian Army in protecting British oil interests in what is now Iraq. Operating a mixture of aircraft, including Caudrons, Maurice Farman Shorthorns, Maurice Farman Longhorns and Martinsydes, the MHF initially undertook unarmed reconnaissance operations, before undertaking light bombing operations later in the year after being attached to No. 30 Squadron RFC. Losses were high and by December, after flying supplies to the besieged garrison at Kut, the MHF was disbanded.

In January 1916, No. 1 Squadron was raised at Point Cook in response to a British request for Australia to raise a full squadron to serve as part of the RFC. Reynolds served as the squadron's commanding officer prior to its embarkation for overseas service. The squadron, consisting of 12 aircraft organised into three flights, arrived in Egypt in April and was subsequently assigned to the RFC's 5th Wing. In mid-June it began operations against Ottoman (Turkish) and Senussi Arab forces in Egypt and Palestine. It would remain in the Middle East until the end of the war, being reassigned to No. 40 Wing in October 1917, undertaking reconnaissance, ground liaison and close air support operations as the British Empire forces advanced into Syria, initially flying a mixture of aircraft, including B.E.2cs, Martinsyde G.100s, B.E.12as and R.E.8s – but later standardising on Bristol Fighters. One of the squadron's pilots, Lieutenant Frank McNamara, received the only Victoria Cross awarded to an Australian airman during the war, for rescuing a fellow pilot who had been downed behind Turkish lines in early 1917. No. 1 Squadron was credited with the destruction of 29 enemy aircraft.

Three other squadrons – No. 2, No. 3 and No. 4 – were raised in 1917 in Egypt or Australia, and were sent to France. Arriving there between August and December, these squadrons subsequently undertook operations under the operational command of British Royal Flying Corps (RFC) wings along the Western Front. No. 2 Squadron, under the command of Major Oswald Watt, who had previously served in the French Foreign Legion, was the first AFC unit to see action in Europe. Flying DH.5 fighters, the squadron made its debut around St Quentin, fighting a short action with a German patrol and suffering the loss of one aircraft forced down. The following month the squadron took part in the Battle of Cambrai, flying combat air patrols, and bombing and strafing missions in support of the British Third Army, suffering heavy losses in dangerous low-level attacks that later received high praise from General Hugh Trenchard, commander of the RFC. The squadron's DH.5s were replaced with superior S.E.5a fighters in December 1917, with which the squadron resumed operations shortly afterwards. Operating R.E.8 reconnaissance aircraft, No. 3 Squadron entered the war during final phase of the Battle of Passchendaele, also in November, during which they were employed largely as artillery spotters. No.4 Squadron entered the fighting last. Equipped with Sopwith Camels, the squadron was dispatched to a quiet sector around Lens initially and did not see combat until January 1918.

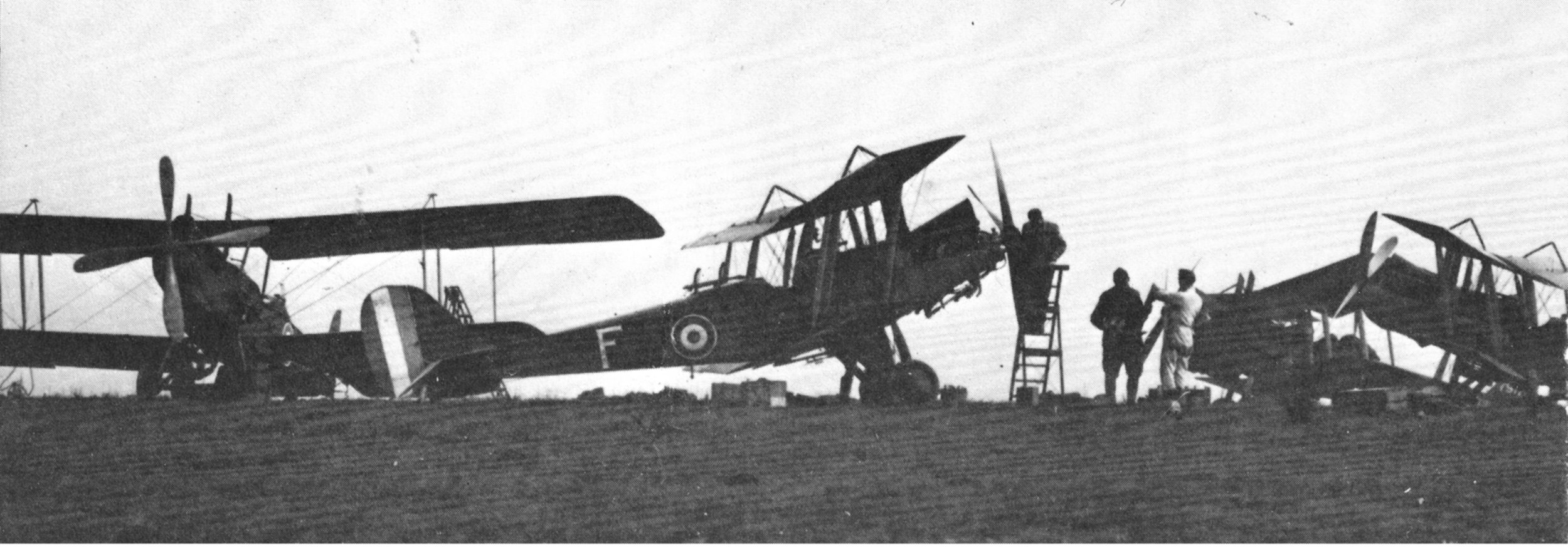
R.E.8s of No 3 Sqn AFC

During the final Allied offensive that eventually brought an end to the war – the Hundred Days Offensive – the AFC squadrons flew reconnaissance and observation missions around Amiens in August, as well as launching raids around Ypres, Arras and Lille. Operations continued until the end of the war, some of the fiercest air-to-air combat occurring on 29 October, when 15 Sopwith Snipes from No. 4 Squadron fought a group of Fokkers that outnumbered them four to one. The Australians shot down 10 German aircraft for the loss of just one of their own. During their time on the Western Front, the two fighter squadrons – No. 2 and 4 – accounted for 384 German aircraft, No. 4 taking credit for 199 and No. 2 for 185. The squadron were also credited with 33 enemy balloons destroyed or driven down. No. 3 Squadron, operating in the corps reconnaissance role, accounted for another 51 aircraft.

=== Organisation ===
By the end of the war, four squadrons had seen active service, operating alongside and under British Royal Flying Corps (and in 1918 the Royal Air Force) command. For administrative reasons, and to avoid confusion with similarly numbered RFC units, at one stage each AFC squadron was allocated an RFC number – the Australians themselves never used these numbers, and in the end, to avoid further confusion, the original AFC numbers were reinstated. The four operational squadrons of the AFC were:

Operational squadrons of the AFC
Australian designation	British designation	Established
No.1 Squadron AFC	No. 67 (Australian) Squadron RFC	1 January 1916
No.2 Squadron AFC	No. 68 (Australian) Squadron RFC	20 September 1916
No.3 Squadron AFC	No. 69 (Australian) Squadron RFC	19 September 1916
No.4 Squadron AFC	No. 71 (Australian) Squadron RFC	16 October 1916

In the Middle East, No. 1 Squadron was initially assigned to No. 5 Wing after being formed, but was later transferred to No. 40 Wing in late 1917, remaining as part of that formation until the end of the war. In Europe, No. 2 Squadron formed part of No. 51 Wing, but in 1918 it was transferred to No. 80 Wing, joining No. 4 Squadron which had been transferred from No. 11 Wing. No. 3 Squadron trained as part of No. 23 Wing until it was committed to the Western Front in August 1917, when it became a "corps squadron", tasked with supporting the British XIII and Canadian Corps.

As well as the operational squadrons, a training wing was established in the United Kingdom. Designated as the 1st Training Wing, it was made up of four squadrons. The four training squadrons of the AFC were:

Training squadrons of the AFC
Australian designation	British designation	Established
No.5 (Training) Squadron AFC	No. 29 (Australian) Squadron, RFC	1 September 1917
No.6 (Training) Squadron AFC	No. 30 (Australian) Squadron, RFC	15 June 1917
No.7 (Training) Squadron AFC	No. 32 (Australian) Squadron, RFC	24 October 1917
No.8 (Training) Squadron AFC	No. 33 (Australian) Squadron, RFC	25 October 1917

As the war progressed, there were plans to increase the AFC's number of operational squadrons from four to fifteen by 1921, but the war came to an end before these could be raised.

== Personnel ==
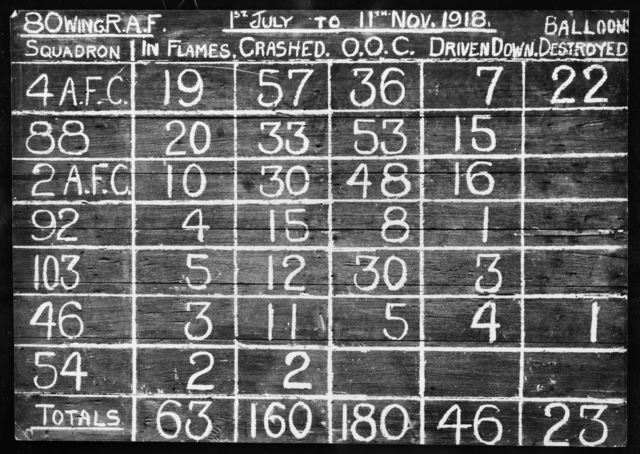
Serny, France, November 1918. A score board recording the claims for enemy aircraft destroyed by No. 80 Wing RAF from July–November 1918, including Nos. 2 and 4 Squadron AFC.

The corps remained small throughout the war, and opportunities to serve in its ranks were limited. A total of 880 officers and 2,840 other ranks served in the AFC, (Note: These figures differ from those provided by Grey: 460 officers and 2,234 other ranks.) of whom only 410 served as pilots and 153 served as observers. A further 200 men served as aircrew in the British flying services – the RFC or the Royal Naval Air Service (RNAS) – including men such as Charles Kingsford Smith and Bert Hinkler, both of whom would have a significant impact upon aviation in Australia after the war. Casualties included 175 dead, 111 wounded, 6 gassed and 40 captured. The majority of these casualties were suffered on the Western Front where 78 Australians were killed, 68 were wounded and 33 became prisoners of war. This represented a casualty rate of 44 percent, which was only marginally lower than most Australian infantry battalions that fought in the trenches, who averaged a casualty rate of around 50 percent. Molkentin attributes the high loss rate in part to the policy of not issuing pilots with parachutes, as well as the fact that the bulk of patrols were conducted over enemy lines, both of which were in keeping with British policy.

Pilots from the AFC's four operational squadrons claimed 527 enemy aircraft destroyed or driven down, and the corps produced 57 flying aces. The highest-scoring AFC pilot was Harry Cobby, who was credited with 29 victories. Other leading aces included Roy King (26), Edgar McCloughry (21), Francis Smith (16), and Roy Phillipps (15). Robert Little and Roderic (Stan) Dallas, the highest-scoring Australian aces of the war, credited with 47 and 39 victories respectively, served with the RNAS. Other Australian aces who served in British units included Jerry Pentland (23), Richard Minifie (21), Edgar Johnston (20), Andrew Cowper (19), Cedric Howell (19), Fred Holliday (17), and Allan Hepburn (16). Several officers gained appointment in senior command roles, two commanding wings and nine commanding squadrons. One member of the AFC was awarded the Victoria Cross and another 40 received the Distinguished Flying Cross, including two who received the awarded three times.

== Equipment ==
The Australian Flying Corps operated a range of aircraft types. These types were mainly of British origin, although French aircraft were also obtained. Over this period aircraft technology progressed rapidly and designs included relatively fragile and rudimentary types to more advanced single-engined biplanes, as well as one twin-engined bomber. The roles performed by these aircraft evolved during the war and included reconnaissance, observation for artillery, aerial bombing and ground attack, patrolling, and the resupply of ground troops on the battlefield by airdrop.

Aircraft flown by the Australian Flying Corps
Aircraft	Origin	Role(s)
Airco DH.5	United Kingdom	fighter
Airco DH.6	United Kingdom	trainer
Armstrong Whitworth F.K.3	United Kingdom	trainer
Avro 504	United Kingdom	trainer
Bleriot XI	France	trainer
Bristol Boxkite	United Kingdom	trainer
Bristol F.2 Fighter	United Kingdom	fighter/reconnaissance
Bristol Scout	United Kingdom	reconnaissance/fighter/trainer
Caudron G.3	France	trainer
Curtiss JN Jenny	United States	trainer
Deperdussin	France	trainer
Grahame-White Type XV Boxkite	United Kingdom	trainer
Handley Page 0/400	United Kingdom	bomber
Martinsyde S.1	United Kingdom	reconnaissance
Martinsyde G.100/G.101	United Kingdom	single seat reconnaissance/bomber
Maurice Farman MF.7 Longhorn	France	trainer
Maurice Farman MF.11 Shorthorn	France	trainer
Maurice Farman Seaplane/Landplane	France	trainer
Royal Aircraft Factory B.E.2	United Kingdom	reconnaissance
Royal Aircraft Factory B.E.12	United Kingdom	single seat reconnaissance/bomber
Royal Aircraft Factory F.E.2	United Kingdom	fighter/reconnaissance
Royal Aircraft Factory R.E.8	United Kingdom	reconnaissance
Royal Aircraft Factory S.E.5a	United Kingdom	fighter
Sopwith 1½ Strutter	United Kingdom	trainer (obsolete fighter/reconnaissance)
Sopwith Buffalo	United Kingdom	ground attack (test only)
Sopwith Camel	United Kingdom	fighter
Sopwith Pup	United Kingdom	trainer (obsolete fighter)
Sopwith Snipe	United Kingdom	fighter

== Training ==
The AFC conducted both pilot and mechanic training in Australia at the Central Flying School, which was established at Point Cook, but this was limited in duration due to embarkation schedules, which meant that further training was required overseas before aircrew were posted to operational squadrons. The first course began on 17 August 1914 and lasted three months; two instructors, Henry Petre and Eric Harrison, who had been recruited from the United Kingdom in 1912 to establish the corps, trained the first batch of Australian aircrew. In the end, a total of eight flying training courses were completed at the Central Flying School during the war, the final course commencing in June 1917. The first six courses consisted only of officers, but the last two, both conducted in early and mid-1917 included non-commissioned officers. These courses ranged in size from four on the first course, to eight on the next three, 16 on the fifth, 24 on the sixth, 31 on the seventh and 17 on the last one. There was limited wastage on the early courses, all trainees successfully completing the first six courses, but final two courses run in 1917 suffered heavily from limited resources and bad weather, resulting in less than half the students graduating. To complement the aviators trained by the CFS, the New South Wales government established its own aviation school at Clarendon, at what later became RAAF Base Richmond, which trained pilots, observers and mechanics. A total of 50 pilots graduated from the school, the majority of its graduates went on to serve in the British flying services, although some served in the AFC.

In early 1917, the AFC began training pilots, observers and mechanics in the United Kingdom. Aircrew were selected from volunteers from other arms such as the infantry, light horse, engineers or artillery, many of whom had previously served at the front, who reverted to the rank of cadet and undertook a six-week foundation course at the two Schools of Military Aeronautics in Reading or Oxford. After this, those who passed graduated to flight training at one of the four AFC training squadrons: Nos. 5, 6, 7 and 8, which were based at Minchinhampton and Leighterton in Gloucestershire.

Flight training in the UK consisted of a total of three hours dual instruction followed by up to a further 20 hours solo flying – although some pilots, including the AFC's highest-scoring ace, Harry Cobby, received less – after which a pilot had to prove his ability to undertake aerial bombing, photography, formation flying, signalling, dog-fighting and artillery observation. Elementary training was undertaken on types such as Shorthorns, Avro 504s and Pups, followed by operational training on Scouts, Camels and RE8s. Upon completion, pilots received their commission and their "wings", and were allocated to the different squadrons based on their aptitude during training: the best were usually sent to scout squadrons, and the remainder to two-seaters.

Initially, the AFC raised its ground staff from volunteer soldiers and civilians who had previous experience or who were trade trained, and when the first AFC squadron was formed these personnel were provided with very limited training that was focused mainly upon basic military skills. As the war progressed, a comprehensive training program was established in which mechanics were trained in nine different trades: welders, blacksmiths, coppersmiths, engine fitters, general fitters, riggers, electricians, magneto-repairers, and machinists. Training was delivered by eight technical sections at Halton Camp. The length of training within each section varied, but was generally between eight and 12 weeks; the more complex trades such as engine fitter required trainees to undertake multiple training courses across several sections. General fitters had the longest training requirements, receiving 32 weeks of instruction.

== Post-war legacy ==
Following the armistice that came into effect on 11 November 1918, the AIF returned to Australia in stages, some elements performing reconstruction and military occupation duties in Europe. No. 4 Squadron AFC took part in the occupation of Germany, the only Australian unit to do so; it operated as part of the British Army of Occupation around Cologne between December 1918 and March 1919 before transferring its aircraft to the British and returning to Australia along with the other three squadrons. Reynolds was succeeded by Colonel Richard Williams in 1919.

Most units of the AFC were disbanded during 1919. The AFC was succeeded by the Australian Air Corps, which was itself succeeded by the Royal Australian Air Force (RAAF) in 1921. Many former members of the AFC such as Cobby, McNamara, Williams, Lawrence Wackett, and Henry Wrigley, went on to play founding roles in the fledgling RAAF. Others, such as John Wright, who served with No. 4 Squadron on the Western Front before commanding the 2/15th Field Regiment in Malaya during the fighting against the Japanese in World War II, returned to a ground role.

== Notes ==
Footnotes

Citations
