= No. 1 Squadron RAAF =

Royal Australian Air Force squadron

- No. 1 Squadron's crest
- Active: 1916–1919; 1925–1942; 1943–1946; 1948–current
- Country: Australia
- Branch: Royal Australian Air Force
- Role: Air-to-air/air-to-surface combat
- Part of: No. 82 Wing
- Garrison/HQ: RAAF Base Amberley
- Nickname: "Fighting First"
- Mottos: Videmus agamus (Latin: "We Seek and We Strike")
- Engagements: World War I World War II; Malayan Emergency; War against the Islamic State
- Battle honours: Egypt 1915–1917; Palestine 1917–1918; Malaya 1948–1960

Commanders
- Notable commanders: Edgar Reynolds (1916); Richard Williams (1917–18); Harry Cobby (1925–26); Raymond Brownell (1926–28); Frank Lukis (1930, 1932–34); Frank Bladin (1934–35); Alan Charlesworth (1936–39); Allan Walters (1940–41); Errol McCormack (1978–79); Leo Davies (2002–03)

Aircraft flown
- Attack: F/A-18F Super Hornet

No. 1 Squadron is a Royal Australian Air Force (RAAF) squadron headquartered at RAAF Base Amberley, Queensland. It is controlled by No. 82 Wing, part of Air Combat Group, and is equipped with Boeing F/A-18F Super Hornet multi-role fighters.

The squadron was formed under the Australian Flying Corps in 1916 and saw action in the Sinai and Palestine campaigns during World War I. It flew obsolete Royal Aircraft Factory B.E.2s, B.E.12s, Martinsyde G.100s and G.102s, as well as Airco DH.6s, Bristol Scouts and Nieuport 17s, before re-equipping with the R.E.8 in October 1917 and finally the Bristol Fighter in December. Its commanding officer in 1917–18 was Major Richard Williams, later known as the "Father of the RAAF". Disbanded in 1919, No. 1 Squadron was re-formed on paper as part of the RAAF in 1922, and re-established as an operational unit three years later. Initially a composite formation of Airco DH.9s and Royal Aircraft Factory S.E.5s, it took on a specialist bomber role in the 1930s, flying mainly Hawker Demons but also Westland Wapitis and Bristol Bulldogs, before re-equipping with Avro Ansons on the eve of World War II.

Converting to Lockheed Hudsons in 1940, No. 1 Squadron saw action in the Malayan and Dutch East Indies campaigns, and suffered severe losses before being reduced to cadre in 1942. It was re-formed with Bristol Beauforts the following year, and re-equipped with de Havilland Mosquitos in 1945 for further operations in the Dutch East Indies. Reduced to cadre once more after the war ended, No. 1 Squadron was re-established at Amberley in 1948 as an Avro Lincoln heavy bomber unit under No. 82 Wing. From 1950 to 1958 it was based in Singapore, flying missions during the Malayan Emergency, where it bore the brunt of the Commonwealth air campaign against communist guerrillas. When it returned to Australia it re-equipped with English Electric Canberra jet bombers. It operated McDonnell Douglas F-4 Phantom II leased from the USAF from 1970 to 1973, as a stop-gap pending delivery of the General Dynamics F-111C swing-wing bomber. The F-111 remained in service for 37 years until replaced by the Super Hornet in 2010. In 2014–15, and again in 2017, a detachment of Super Hornets was deployed to the Middle East as part of Australia's contribution to the war against the Islamic State.

== Role and equipment ==
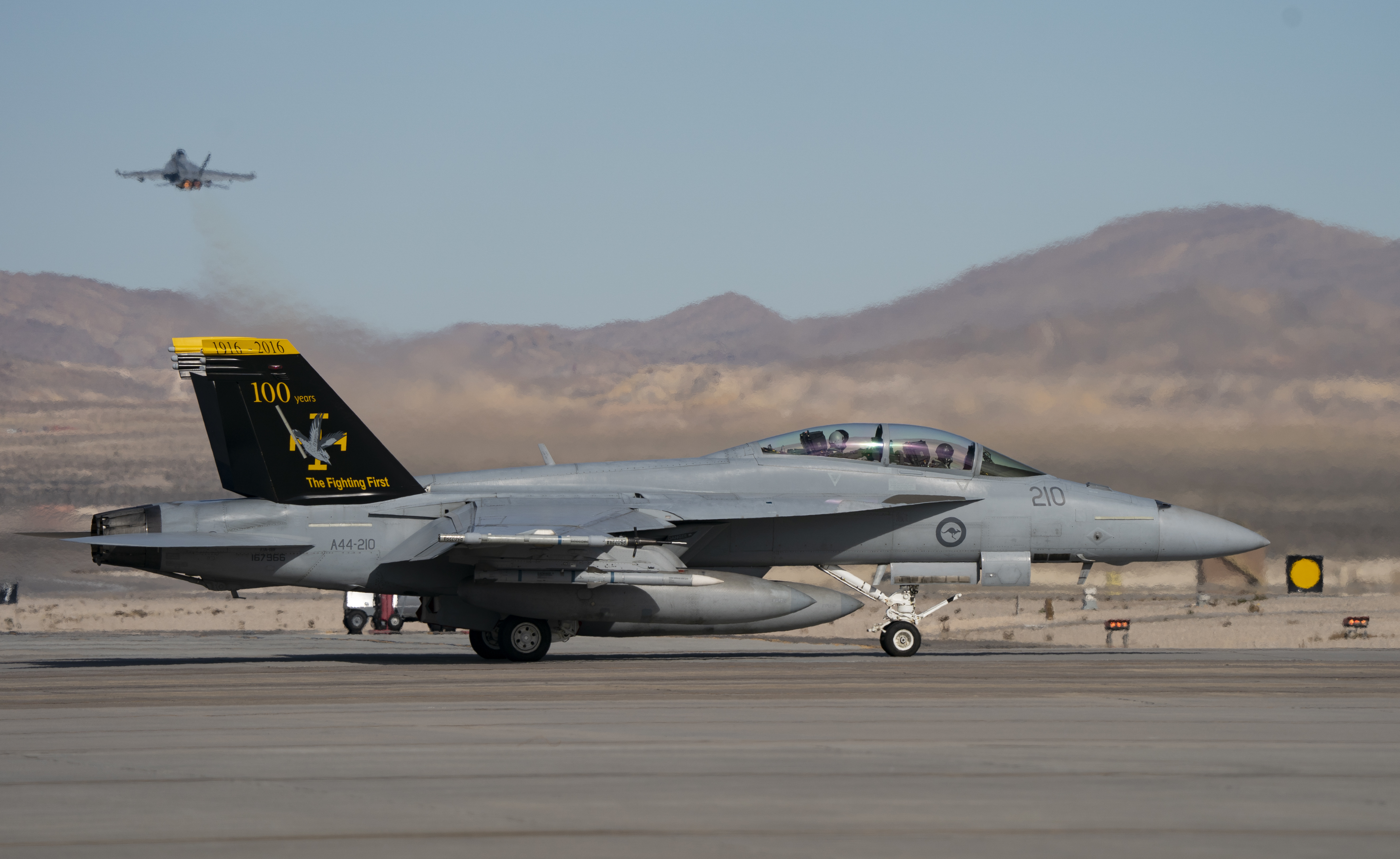
F/A-18F Super Hornet of No. 1 Squadron, February 2020

No. 1 Squadron is located at RAAF Base Amberley, Queensland, and controlled by No. 82 Wing, which is part of Air Combat Group. Its mission responsibilities include air-to-air and air-to-surface combat. The squadron is nicknamed the "Fighting First". The blazon of its crest is "the Australian Kookaburra in a diving position superimposed on the cross of Jerusalem", which symbolises the Victoria Cross-winning action of No. 1 Squadron pilot Frank McNamara in Palestine during World War I. The unit motto is Videmus Agamus ("We see and we strike").

The squadron operates Boeing F/A-18F Super Hornet multi-role fighters, the first of which entered service in March 2010. Nicknamed the "Rhino", its missions include air superiority, fighter escort, land strike, maritime strike, close air support, and reconnaissance. The Super Hornet is larger than the "classic" McDonnell Douglas F/A-18 Hornet formerly operated by the RAAF, carries more ordnance, and has a greater fuel capacity. It is fitted with a 20 mm cannon and can be armed with air-to-air and anti-shipping missiles, as well as a variety of air-to-ground bombs and missiles. Flown by a crew of two, a pilot and an air combat officer (ACO), it is capable of engaging targets in the air and on the surface simultaneously. It can be refuelled in flight by the RAAF's Airbus KC-30A Multi Role Tanker Transports. The Super Hornets are serviced at the operating level by No. 1 Squadron technical staff; heavier maintenance is conducted by Boeing Defence Australia and other contractors.

== History ==
=== World War I ===
No. 1 Squadron was established as a unit of the Australian Flying Corps (AFC) at Point Cook, Victoria, in January 1916 under the command of Lieutenant Colonel Edgar Reynolds. With a complement of 28 officers, 195 airmen, no aircraft and little training, it sailed for Egypt in mid-March 1916, arriving at Suez a month later. There it came under the control of the 5th Wing of the Royal Flying Corps (RFC). Major Foster Rutledge, an Australian serving in the RFC, took command on 1 June. After training in England and Egypt, the unit was declared operational at its new headquarters in Heliopolis on 12 June, when it took over aircraft belonging to No. 17 Squadron RFC. Its three flights were, however, operating in isolation at different bases in the Sinai Desert, and the squadron did not reunite until December. Flying primitive and poorly armed Royal Aircraft Factory B.E.2 two-seat biplanes, its primary roles during this period of the Sinai campaign were reconnaissance—including aerial photography—and artillery spotting for the British Army. No. 1 Squadron pilots attached to No. 14 Squadron RFC took part in the Battle of Romani in July and August. In September and October, B and C Flights, led by Captains Oswald Watt and Richard Williams respectively, undertook bombing and reconnaissance missions in support of the Australian Light Horse in northern Sinai.

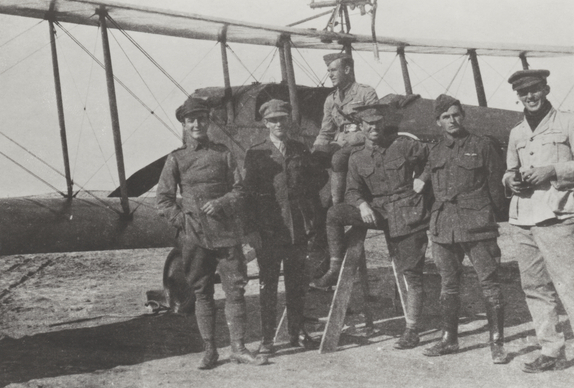
Members of C Flight, No. 1 Squadron, including Lieutenant McNamara (left), Captain Williams (third from right) and Lieutenant Wackett (right), in front of a Martinsyde near the Suez Canal, Egypt, 1917

On 12 September 1916, the British began to refer to No. 1 Squadron as No. 67 (Australian) Squadron RFC. This practice continued until January 1918, when the unit officially became known as No. 1 Squadron AFC. The relationship between airmen and ground crew was less formal than in British units; squadron members recalled that "The CO is the only one who is ever called 'sir'" and that officers did not demand "saluting and standing to attention and all that rot". The unit received the first of several Martinsyde G.100 single-seat fighters to augment the B.E.2s on 16 October; although considered obsolete, the "Tinsyde" was substantially faster than the B.E.2, and armed with forward-firing machine guns. Shortly before the squadron took part in a bombing raid against Beersheba on 11 November, Lieutenant Lawrence Wackett managed to fix a machine gun to the top plane of one of the B.E.2s, using a mount he designed himself. Each flight was also assigned a Bristol Scout beginning in December, but it too was obsolete and under-powered, and the squadron ceased operating the type within three months. Other older models issued to the unit included the Airco DH.6, Martinsyde G.102 and Nieuport 17. On 17 December, the squadron's flights were finally brought together at one base, Mustabig in Sinai.

March 1917 saw the heaviest bombing campaign carried out by the squadron to date; short of its regular 20-pound (9.1 kg) ordnance, the pilots improvised by dropping 6-inch (150 mm) howitzer shells on Turkish forces along the Gaza–Beersheba line. During one such mission on 20 March, Lieutenant Frank McNamara earned the Victoria Cross for landing his Martinsyde in the desert under enemy fire and rescuing a fellow pilot whose B.E.2 had been forced down. On 26 March, No. 1 Squadron took part in the First Battle of Gaza; it suffered its first combat death the next day, when one of its B.E.2s was attacked by a German Rumpler. The unit participated in the Second Battle of Gaza on 19 April; like its predecessor, the attack was a failure for the Allies. Williams, later known as the "Father of the RAAF", assumed command of the squadron in May. Two B.E.12s were delivered the same month; like the Martinsydes, they were armed with a forward-firing machine gun and employed as escorts for the B.E.2s. By June, mechanical issues caused by hot summer weather and the threat from new German Albatros scouts were rendering the B.E.2s largely ineffective, and Williams urgently requested newer models. Modern aircraft were eventually delivered, first the Royal Aircraft Factory R.E.8 in October, and then the Bristol F.2 Fighter in December. "Now for the first time," wrote Williams, "after 17 months in the field we had aircraft with which we could deal with our enemy in the air."

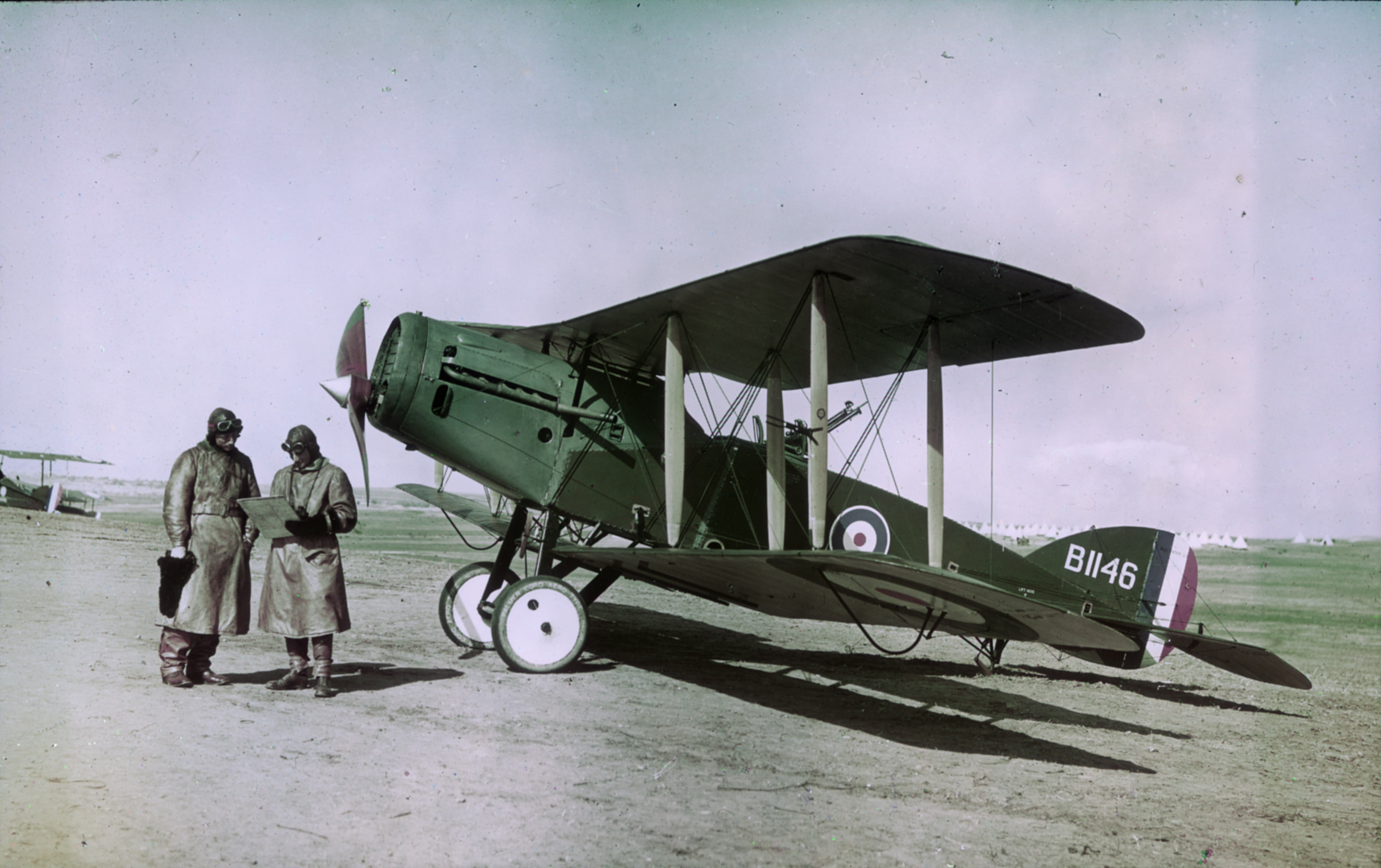
Lieutenant Ross Smith (left) with a No. 1 Squadron Bristol Fighter, Palestine, February 1918

No. 1 Squadron joined the 40th (Army) Wing of the RFC's Palestine Brigade on 5 October 1917. On 22 and 24 November, the squadron bombed Bireh village during the Battle of Jerusalem. The first of its 29 confirmed aerial victories, over an Albatros, occurred on 3 January 1918. By month's end, its complement of aircraft included five B.E.2s, five Martinsydes, two R.E.8s, and nine Bristol Fighters. The squadron supported the Capture of Jericho in February 1918. It carried out air raids and reconnoitred prior to the First Transjordan attack on Amman in March and prior to the Second Transjordan attack on Shunet Nimrin and Es Salt a month later; it also flew reconnaissance missions during the advance to and fighting near Es Salt and Jisr ed Damieh. By the end of March, it was equipped with 18 Bristol Fighters, which had replaced all the other types. As well as undertaking offensive operations, the Bristol Fighters served in the photo-reconnaissance role. During the last week of April 1918, the squadron moved its base forward from Mejdel to a new aerodrome outside Ramleh. Williams relinquished command in June to take over 40th Wing.

Beginning in August 1918, members of No. 1 Squadron, including one of its aces, Lieutenant Ross Smith, were attached to Colonel T.E. Lawrence's Arab army to protect it against German bombing. In September, the squadron began operating a Handley Page O/400, the only Allied heavy bomber in the Middle East and the only twin-engined aircraft flown by the AFC. That month it joined the Bristol Fighters in the final offensive of the Palestinian campaign, the Battle of Armageddon, inflicting what the Australian official history described as "wholesale destruction" on the Turkish Seventh Army. By October, the Bristol Fighters had moved forward from Ramleh to Haifa and by the middle of the month were required to patrol and reconnoitre an exceptionally wide area of country, sometimes between 500 and 600 miles (800 and 970 km), flying over Rayak, Homs, Beirut, Tripoli, Hama, Aleppo, Killis and Alexandretta. They bombed the German aerodromes at Rayak, where 32 German machines had been either abandoned or burnt, on 2 October. On 19 October, the first German aircraft was seen in the air since fighting over Deraa in mid-September, just prior to the Battle of Sharon. Smith and another pilot forced a DFW two-seater to land, and destroyed it on the ground by firing a Very light into the aircraft after the German pilot and observer had moved to safety. In the wake of the 31 October armistice with Turkey, the squadron relocated to Ramleh in December, and then in February 1919 to Kantara. There its members were personally farewelled by General Sir Edmund Allenby, who congratulated them for achieving "absolute supremacy of the air ... a factor of paramount importance" to the Allied campaign.

=== Inter-war years ===
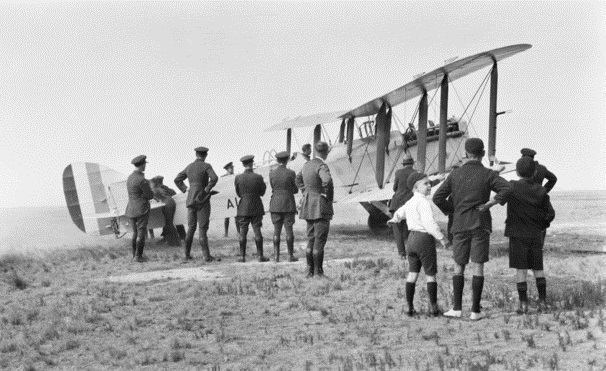
Airco DH.9a at RAAF Point Cook, 1926

No. 1 Squadron returned to Australia on 5 March 1919, and was disbanded. In 1921, the Royal Australian Air Force (RAAF) was established as a separate branch of the military, and on 1 January 1922, the squadron was re-formed on paper. Its planned strength, approved by the Air Board in December 1921, was three officers and five airmen, operating four Airco DH.9s. Funding problems for the fledgling Air Force resulted in the disbandment on 1 July of No. 1 Squadron and other units established at the same time, their aircraft and personnel instead forming a single squadron of six flights under the control of No. 1 Flying Training School (No. 1 FTS) at Point Cook. No. 1 Squadron was reactivated as an operational unit of the RAAF reserve, known as the Citizen Air Force (CAF), at Point Cook on 1 July 1925. Its commanding officer was Flight Lieutenant Harry Cobby.

Like No. 3 Squadron, formed the same day at Point Cook but transferred to RAAF Richmond, New South Wales, three weeks later, No. 1 Squadron was a multi-purpose or "composite" unit made up of three flights, each of which had a different role and comprised four aircraft: A Flight operated DH.9s for army cooperation, B Flight operated Royal Aircraft Factory S.E.5 fighters, and C Flight operated DH.9A bombers. A third of the squadron's complement of 27 officers and 169 airmen was Permanent Air Force (PAF), and the rest CAF. No. 1 Squadron relocated from Point Cook to nearby RAAF Laverton on 1 January 1928. The RAAF retired its S.E.5s the same year, and in 1929 took delivery of Westland Wapiti general-purpose aircraft to replace its DH.9s and DH.9As. Through the inter-war years, No. 1 Squadron undertook a range of tasks including civil aid, flood and bushfire relief, search and rescue, aerial surveys, and air show demonstrations. In October 1930, a de Havilland DH.60 Moth attached to the unit conducted Australia's first crop-dusting operation, at the behest of the Victorian Forestry Commission.

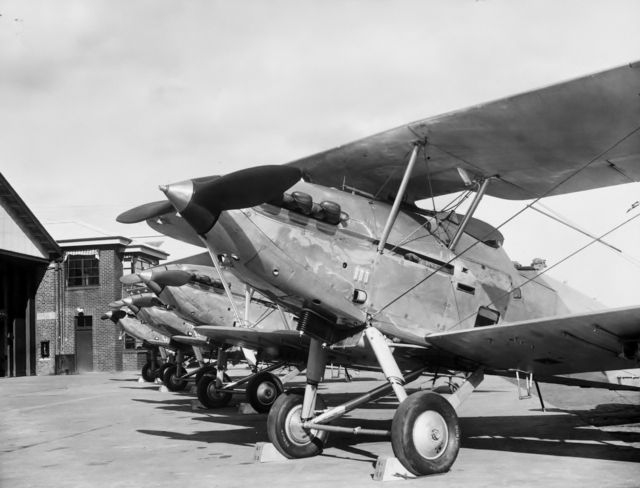
Hawker Demons of No. 1 Squadron at RAAF Laverton, August 1938

RAAF squadrons began adopting specialised roles in the early 1930s, No. 1 Squadron becoming No. 1 Single-Engined Bomber Squadron. By November 1935 it was made up of two flights of newly delivered Hawker Demon fighter-bombers, and one of Wapitis. In December 1935 it was augmented by No. 1 FTS's Fighter Squadron and its six Bristol Bulldogs, which were redesignated fighter-bombers. Nos. 21 and 22 (Cadre) Squadrons were formed on 20 April 1936 at Laverton and Richmond, respectively, absorbing the CAF personnel of Nos. 1 and 3 Squadrons, which became PAF units. The same day, No. 1 Squadron was renamed No. 1 (Fighter Bomber) Squadron. This reorganisation temporarily denuded No. 1 Squadron of most of its aircraft, leaving only A Flight, with four Bulldogs and a Wapiti, in operation. The Wapiti was transferred to No. 1 FTS in July, and by the end of the month the squadron's complement of aircraft stood at four Bulldogs and one Moth.

No. 1 Squadron began receiving new Demons in November 1936. In January 1937, it relinquished its Bulldogs to No. 21 Squadron, which was to hold them until they could be transferred to the soon-to-be-formed No. 2 Squadron. By the end of February, No. 1 Squadron's strength was 12 Demons and one Moth, 11 officers and 108 airmen. The unit was redesignated No. 1 (Bomber) Squadron in August 1937. Towards the end of the year, it was plagued by several Demon accidents, resulting in a series of inquiries and a review of RAAF procedures in 1938 by Marshal of the RAF Sir Edward Ellington; the so-called Ellington Report and its criticism of air safety standards led to the removal of Air Vice-Marshal Richard Williams from his position as Chief of the Air Staff, which he had held since the formation of the Air Force. No. 1 Squadron received the RAAF's first three CAC Wirraways on 10 July 1939. As the likelihood of war increased, the squadron's role was altered to incorporate reconnaissance as well as bombing, resulting in the transfer out of all Demons and Wirraways and the transfer in from other units of nine Avro Ansons on 28–29 August 1939; at the end of the month its personnel comprised nine officers and 122 airmen.

=== World War II ===
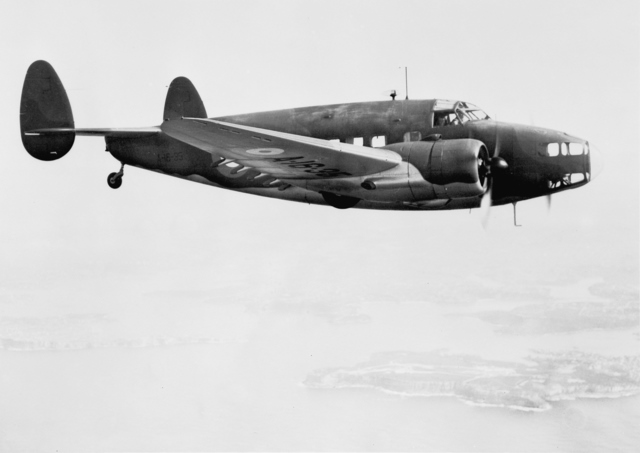
Lockheed Hudson of No. 1 Squadron, c. 1940

Following the outbreak of World War II, No. 1 Squadron's Ansons were tasked with maritime patrol and convoy escort duties. In 1940, the squadron became the RAAF's inaugural Lockheed Hudson unit; it received its first Hudson on 30 March, and by the end of May had transferred out the last of its Ansons and was operating 11 of the new aircraft. Deployed to Malaya to conduct maritime reconnaissance, No. 1 Squadron arrived at Sembawang, Singapore, on 4 July 1940. It relocated to RAF Kota Bharu, near the Malaya–Thailand border, in August 1941. Two days before the attack on Malaya, its Hudsons spotted the Japanese invasion fleet but, given uncertainty about the ships' destination and instructions to avoid offensive operations until attacks were made against friendly territory, Air Chief Marshal Sir Robert Brooke-Popham did not allow the convoy to be bombed. Shortly after midnight, local time, on the night of 7/8 December, the Japanese force started landing on the beaches at Kota Bharu, close to the airfield, and from about 02:00, No. 1 Squadron launched a series of assaults on the Japanese forces, becoming the first aircraft to make an attack in the Pacific War. The Hudsons sank a Japanese transport ship, the IJN Awazisan Maru, and damaged two more transports, the Ayatosan Maru and Sakura Maru, for the loss of two Hudsons, an hour before the attack on Pearl Harbor. By the end of the day, Japanese ground forces had advanced to the outskirts of the airfield, forcing the squadron's remaining airworthy aircraft to be evacuated to Kuantan, and from there back to Singapore.

By Christmas Eve 1941, No. 1 Squadron had five serviceable aircraft. Together with No. 8 Squadron RAAF, also equipped with Hudsons, it was tasked with maritime patrols to the east of Singapore. On 26 January 1942, two of the squadron's Hudsons spotted a Japanese convoy heading for Endau, on the east coast of Malaya. It was decided to attack the convoy with all possible strength, including four Hudsons from No. 1 Squadron and five from No. 8 Squadron, together with obsolete Vickers Vildebeest and Fairey Albacore biplanes of Nos. 36 and 100 Squadrons RAF, and with what little fighter escort could be found. The convoy was strongly defended by Japanese fighters, and although all nine Hudsons returned to Singapore, several were badly shot up. The rest of the strike force did not fare as well; 11 Vildebeests, two Albacores, two Hudsons (of No. 62 Squadron RAF) and three fighters were lost. By the end of the month, No. 1 Squadron had withdrawn to airfield P.2 on Sumatra, along with several other Commonwealth units including No. 8 Squadron. It continued to attack Japanese bases in Malaya and convoys in the Dutch East Indies, relocating to Semplak, Java, in mid-February. At Semplak it took over the Hudsons of No. 8 Squadron and No. 62 Squadron RAF, giving it a strength of 25 aircraft; at one stage it was to be renumbered as an RAF squadron, but this never occurred. Heavily outnumbered by Japanese air units, which raided Allied bases with impunity, No. 1 Squadron suffered heavy losses and was ordered to withdraw its four remaining Hudsons to Australia on 2 March 1942, disbanding soon after. Although 120 of the squadron's personnel were evacuated from Java, 160 men including the commanding officer, Wing Commander Davis, were unable to escape and were taken prisoner by the Japanese; less than half survived captivity.

No. 1 Squadron was re-formed with Bristol Beauforts on 1 December 1943 at Menangle, New South Wales. By March 1944 it had deployed to Gould, Northern Territory, where it was controlled by No. 79 Wing under North-Western Area Command. Its strength at the beginning of the month was some 350 officers and men, and 19 Beauforts. The squadron commenced reconnaissance operations on 20 March, and undertook its first bombing mission on 4 April against Lautem, East Timor. It attacked other targets in Timor during May, losing two aircraft. Having undertaken 82 sorties in July, the Beauforts concentrated on maritime reconnaissance from August, using air-to-surface radar during operations from Gould and Gove. After re-equipping with de Havilland Mosquito fighter-bombers at Kingaroy, Queensland, in January 1945, the squadron deployed to Morotai in May and then Labuan Island in June–July. Now part of No. 86 (Attack) Wing, it flew only a few missions before the end of the war, losing one Mosquito. No. 1 Squadron returned to Australia in December 1945 and was disbanded at Narromine, New South Wales, on 7 August 1946.

=== Malayan Emergency ===
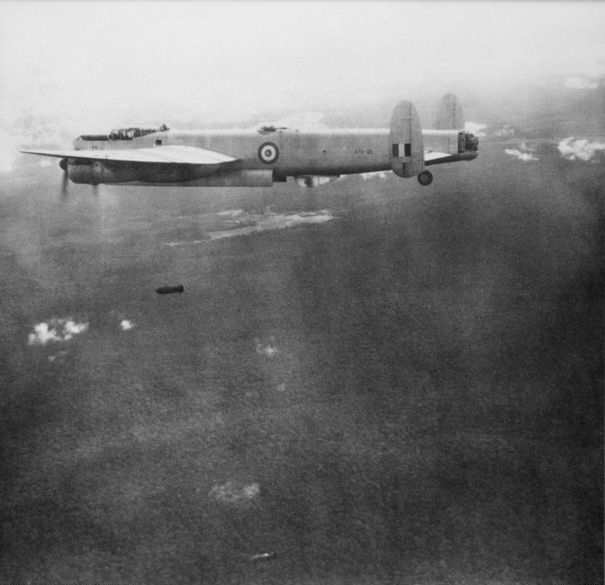
Avro Lincoln of No. 1 Squadron dropping 500-pound (230 kg) bombs on communist targets during the Malayan Emergency, c. 1950

No. 1 Squadron was re-formed as a heavy bomber unit on 23 February 1948, when No. 12 Squadron was re-designated. Operating Avro Lincolns, it was based at RAAF Station Amberley, Queensland, where it formed part of No. 82 (Bomber) Wing. The wing's aircraft were serviced by No. 482 (Maintenance) Squadron. From July 1950 to July 1958—for the first two-and-a-half years under the auspices of No. 90 (Composite) Wing—it was based in Singapore, flying missions against communist guerrillas during the Malayan Emergency. Tasked by RAF Air Headquarters Malaya, the Lincolns generally conducted area bombing missions, as well as strikes against pinpoint targets. They operated singly and in formations, sometimes in concert with RAF bombers, and often strafed targets with their machine guns and 20 mm cannon after dropping ordnance. The Lincolns were considered well suited to the campaign, owing to their range and ability to fly at low speeds to search for targets, as well as their firepower and heavy bomb load. Not having to contend with anti-aircraft fire, they flew mainly by day, but No. 1 Squadron also operated by night, the only Commonwealth unit to do so.

The squadron carried out its own day-to-day maintenance in Malaya; the Lincolns were rotated back to Australia for major work. Its original complement of six aircraft was increased to eight after the British Air Ministry requested in February 1951 that Australia augment its bomber force to partly offset the imminent withdrawal of the RAF's Lincolns to Bomber Command in Europe. The squadron was awarded the Gloucester Cup for proficiency in 1950–51 and 1954–55. It suffered no casualties during the campaign but two of its aircraft were written off: one that overshot the landing strip at Tengah in November 1951, and another that crashed into the sea off Johore after striking trees on takeoff in January 1957.

Although the original purpose of the bombing campaign in Malaya was to kill as many insurgents as possible, the impracticality of achieving this in operations over dense jungle resulted in a shift towards harassing and demoralising the communists, driving them out of their bases and into areas held by Commonwealth ground troops. Operation Kingly Pile, which involved two sorties by No. 1 Squadron and one by English Electric Canberra jet bombers of No. 12 Squadron RAF on 21 February 1956, was considered the most successful of the more than 4,000 missions conducted by the Lincolns, killing at least 14 communist troops. By the time it was withdrawn to Australia in July 1958, No. 1 Squadron had dropped over 14,000 tonnes of bombs—85 per cent of the total delivered by Commonwealth forces during the Emergency. Its service was recognised with the presentation of a Squadron Standard by the Commander-in-Chief Far East Air Force, Air Marshal The Earl of Brandon. As at 2014, the Malayan Emergency marked the last occasion that the unit took part in combat operations.

=== Jet era ===
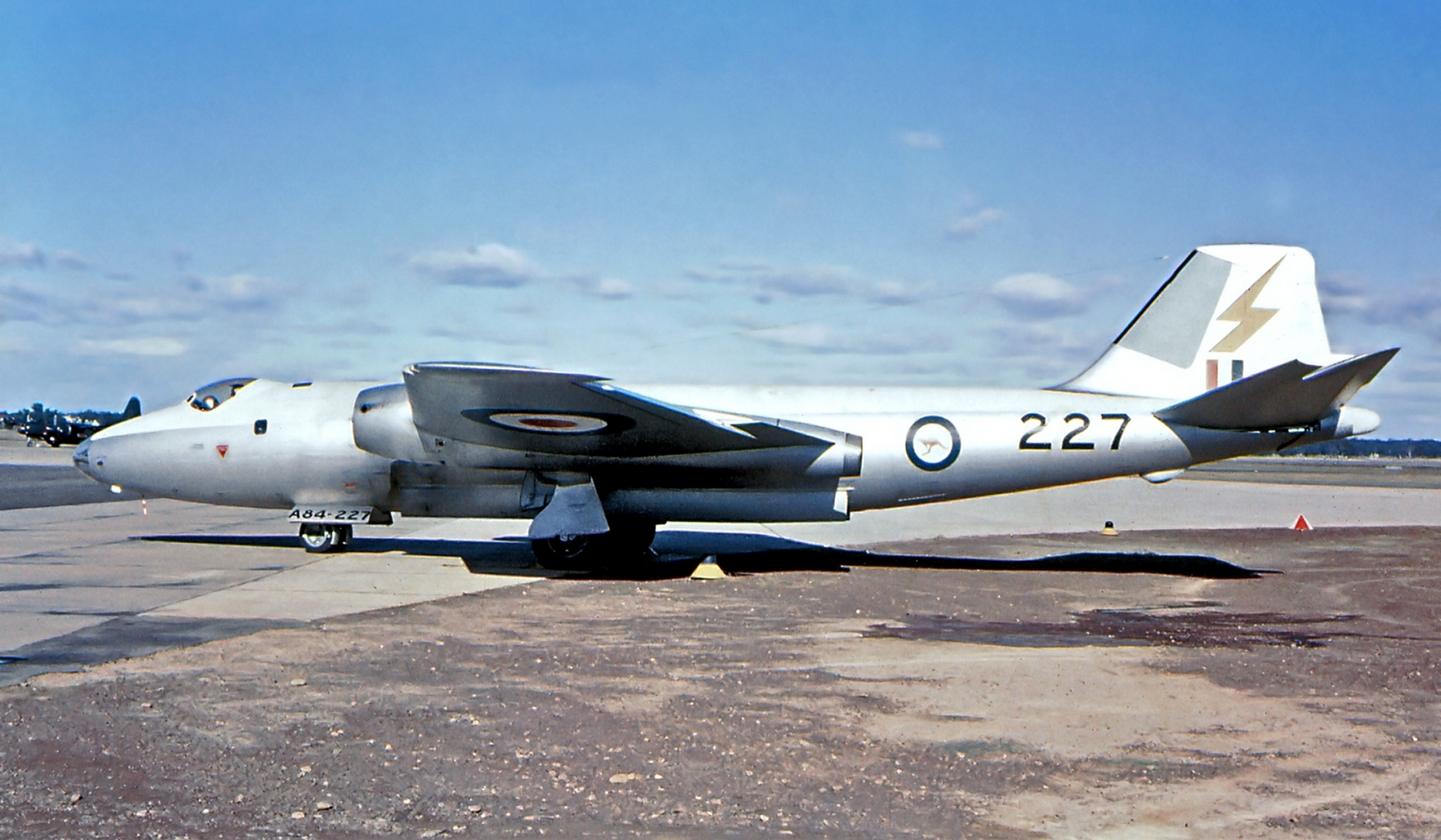
English Electric Canberra of the RAAF, 1964

No. 1 Squadron re-equipped with Canberra Mk.20s after returning to Australia. The RAAF's first jet bomber, the Canberra was subsonic but had long range and was highly manoeuvrable. It had been procured partly for its capacity to deliver nuclear weapons, an ordnance option the government seriously contemplated but never acquired. Initially the Canberra's envisaged mission profile was medium-to-high-altitude area bombing but its primitive bombsight and light load made this a dubious proposition, and by mid-1961 crews were training in low-level army cooperation tactics. No. 1 Squadron was awarded successive Gloucester Cups for its proficiency in 1959–60 and 1960–61. As of January 1962, its strength was eight aircraft and 53 personnel, including 18 officers. The unit effectively ceased operations in 1968, to begin converting to the General Dynamics F-111C supersonic bomber, which was expected to enter service soon afterwards. Already controversial owing to its escalating cost, the F-111 program was heavily delayed by airworthiness concerns related to its swing-wing technology. In September 1970, as an interim measure while awaiting delivery of the F-111, No. 1 Squadron relinquished its Canberras for leased McDonnell Douglas F-4E Phantoms. Although the Phantom had a multi-role capability, the RAAF employed it as a strike aircraft to maintain compatibility with the proposed F-111 mission profile. One of No. 1 Squadron's Phantoms was lost with its crew of two in June 1971, the only fatalities and hull loss of the 24 aircraft leased to the RAAF. Though not as sophisticated an aircraft as the F-111, the Phantom was a significant advance over the Canberra, and well regarded by its Australian crews.

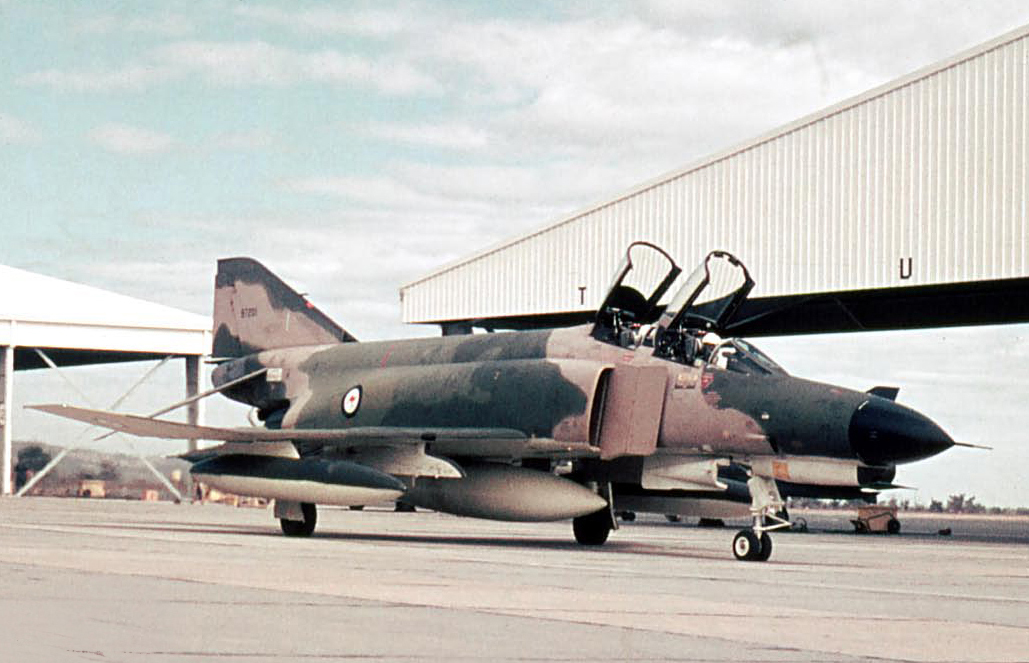
F-4E Phantom of the RAAF, 1971

No. 82 Wing accepted its first F-111Cs in June 1973. The Chief of the Air Staff, Air Marshal Charles Read, ordered that the new aircraft be flown with great caution initially, well within operational limits, to minimise the possibility of further damage to its reputation through early attrition. No. 1 Squadron was assigned 12 of the initial 24 aircraft delivered. It was No. 82 Wing's lead strike force, No. 6 Squadron's primary task being crew conversion training. The wing employed a centralised servicing regime, whereby all aircraft and maintenance personnel were held by No. 482 Squadron, which released the F-111s in line with Nos. 1 and 6 Squadrons' joint flying program. In February 1981, responsibility for operating-level servicing of the F-111s was transferred to the flying squadrons, which for the first time took direct control of their F-111s. No. 482 Squadron continued to provide intermediate-level servicing; major upgrades and complex maintenance were carried out by No. 3 Aircraft Depot. These two organisations merged in 1992 to form No. 501 Wing, which handed over heavy maintenance of the F-111 to Boeing Australia in 2001. Between 1977 and 1993, the RAAF lost seven F-111Cs in crashes. Three of the accidents involved aircraft flown by No. 1 Squadron: in August 1979, January 1986 and September 1993, the last two killing both crew members. In July 1996, No. 1 Squadron took responsibility for aerial reconnaissance using specially modified RF-111Cs previously operated by No. 6 Squadron. This gave No. 1 Squadron five mission types: land strike, maritime strike, close air support, long-range air defence, and reconnaissance. In May 1999 the unit was again awarded the Gloucester Cup for proficiency.

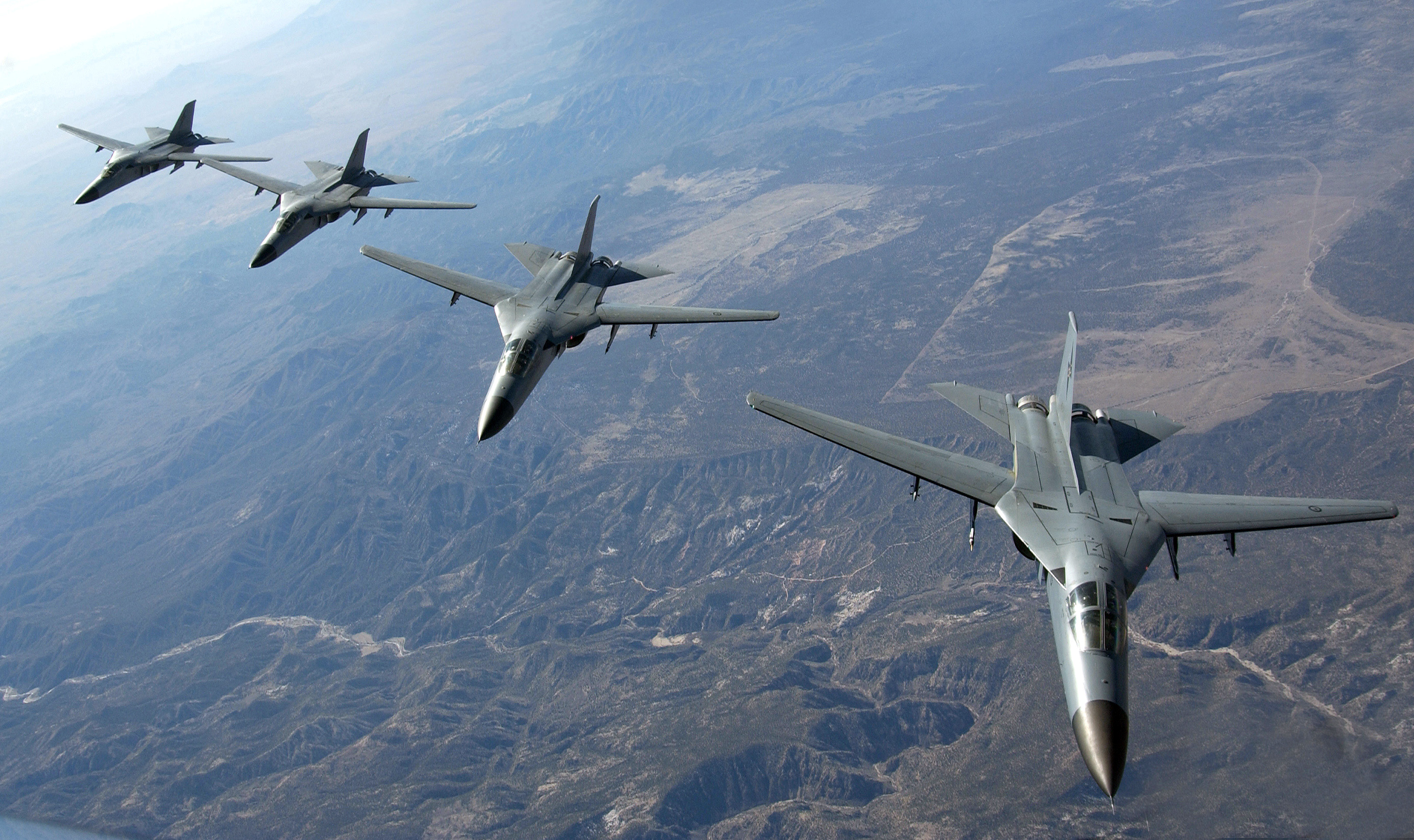
F-111s of No. 1 Squadron, February 2006

Along with its revolutionary variable-sweep wings, the F-111 was equipped with terrain-following radar and an escape module that jettisoned the entire cockpit in an emergency, rather than individual ejection seats. Its top speed was Mach 2.5 and its combat radius allowed it to reach targets in Indonesia from bases in northern Australia. Upon delivery in 1973 it was fitted with analogue avionics and could only drop unguided ("dumb") bombs. In its 37 years of service with the RAAF the type went through several upgrades, including the Pave Tack infra-red and laser-guided precision weapons targeting system, Harpoon anti-shipping missiles, and advanced digital avionics. Alan Stephens, in the official history of the post-war Air Force, described the F-111 as "the region's pre-eminent strike aircraft" and the RAAF's most important acquisition. The closest they came to being used in anger, though, was during Australian-led INTERFET operations in East Timor commencing in September 1999. Both F-111 squadrons were deployed to RAAF Base Tindal, Northern Territory, to support the international forces in case of action by the Indonesian military, and remained there until December; six of No. 1 Squadron's aircraft and approximately 100 personnel were involved. From 20 September, when INTERFET forces began to arrive in East Timor, the F-111s were maintained at a high level of readiness to conduct reconnaissance flights or air strikes if the situation deteriorated. As it happened, INTERFET did not encounter significant resistance, and F-111 operations were limited to reconnaissance by RF-111Cs from 5 November through 9 December.

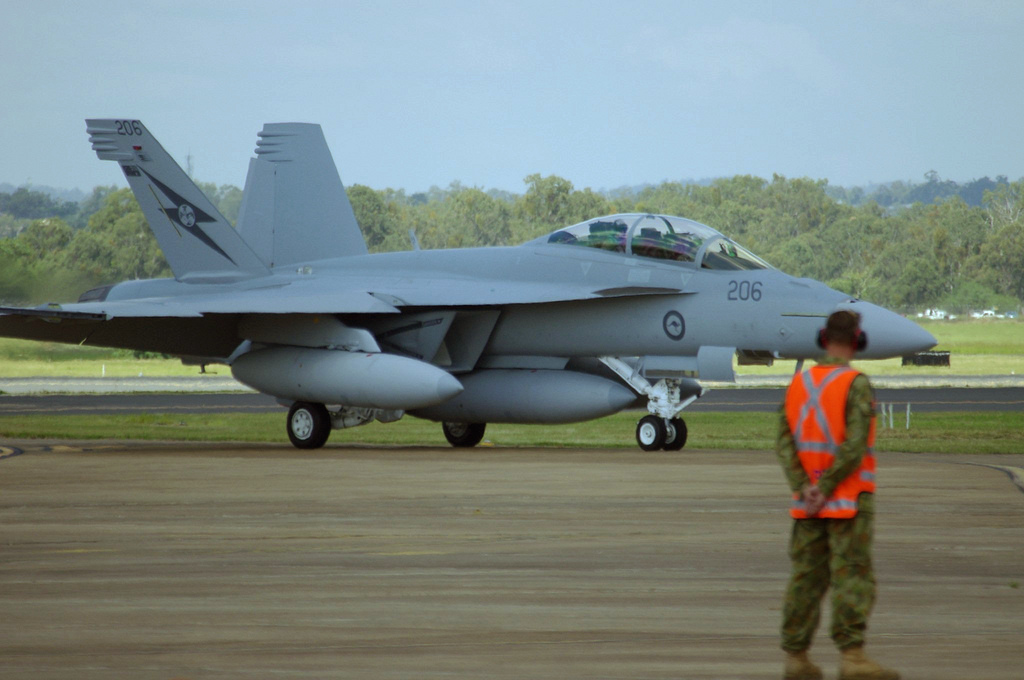
F/A-18F Super Hornet of No. 1 Squadron on arrival at RAAF Base Amberley, March 2010

In 2007, the Australian government decided to retire the F-111s by 2010, and acquire 24 Boeing F/A-18F Super Hornets as an interim replacement, pending the arrival of the Lockheed Martin F-35 Lightning then being developed. The F-111 fleet was considered to be at risk due to fatigue, and too expensive to operate as each aircraft required 180 hours of maintenance for every hour of flying time. No. 1 Squadron ceased operating the F-111 in January 2009, in preparation for converting to the Super Hornet. Former F-111 aircrew, familiar with side-by-side seating and a different performance envelope, found conversion more challenging than pilots experienced in the RAAF's McDonnell Douglas F/A-18 Hornet fighters, which shared many characteristics with the newer model. No. 1 Squadron re-equipped between 26 March 2010 and 21 October 2011, making it the first Australian unit, and the first squadron outside the United States, to fly the Super Hornet. It became operational with its new aircraft on 8 December 2011. The multi-role Super Hornet allowed No. 1 Squadron to augment its previous offensive strike role with an air-to-air combat function. The RAAF attained full operational capability with the Super Hornet in December 2012.

In April 2014, the government purchased 58 F-35s in addition to 14 already ordered, for the express purpose of replacing the 71 "classic" Hornets of Nos. 3, 75 and 77 Squadrons and No. 2 Operational Conversion Unit. A government decision on whether to purchase a further 28 F-35s, to be based at Amberley, would depend on how long the Super Hornets were to be retained. According to Australian Aviation, continuing delays to the F-35 program had increased the likelihood that the Super Hornets would, rather than being disposed of early as originally planned, continue to be operated by the RAAF for their full service life of over 20 years. On 14 September, the Federal government committed to deploying up to eight Super Hornets of No. 1 Squadron to Al Minhad Air Base in the United Arab Emirates, as part of the Australian Air Task Group joining the coalition against Islamic State of Iraq and the Levant (ISIL) forces in Iraq. The Super Hornets conducted their first mission over Iraq on 5 October, and their first strike four days later. According to the Department of Defence, as of 20 December 2014 the Super Hornets had flown over 180 sorties, dropped 113 weapons, and destroyed 36 ISIL targets, damaging another six. In March 2015, having flown almost 3,000 hours in over 400 missions, the detachment was replaced by six F/A-18As from No. 75 Squadron.

No. 1 Squadron commemorated its centenary in 2016 with several events including, on 8 June, a flight over Amberley by Super Hornets in concert with a vintage Bristol Fighter. On 23 November, the 12 Super Hornets operated by No. 6 Squadron were transferred to No. 1 Squadron in preparation for the former unit converting to an electronic warfare role with the Boeing EA-18G Growler in 2017. At the same time, a training flight was established within No. 1 Squadron to deliver refresher training on the Super Hornet. A detachment of No. 1 Squadron was again deployed to Al Minhad as part of the Australian Air Task Group in May 2017, replacing the legacy Hornets of No. 77 Squadron. The Super Hornets flew the last strike mission of their rotation, and the last of 2,700 sorties by the Air Task Group Hornets, on 14 January 2018. In April, No. 1 Squadron was awarded the 2017 Gloucester Cup. The squadron's training flight and six Super Hornets were transferred to the newly established No. 82 Wing Training Flight in June 2020.

== Aircraft operated ==
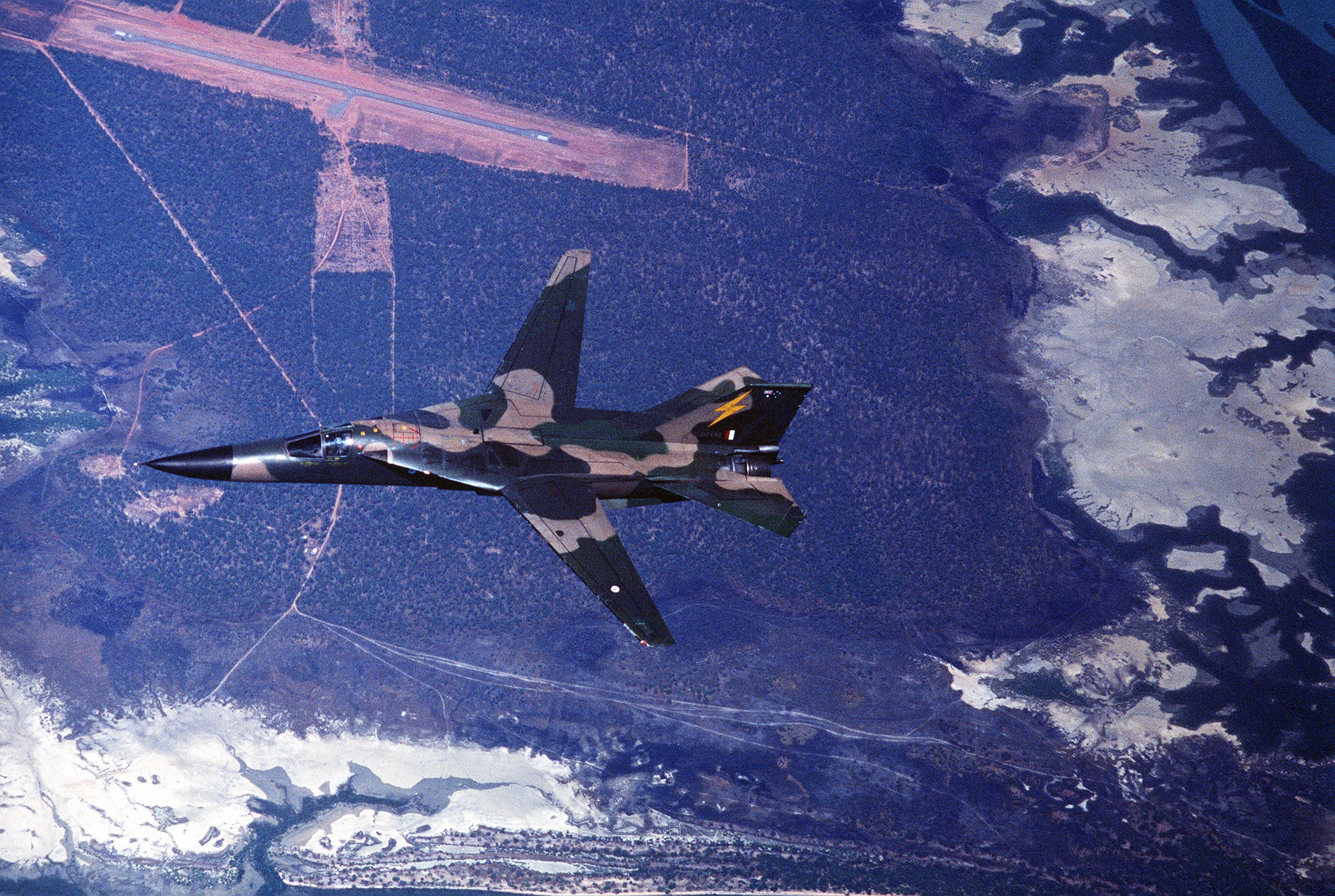
F-111C of No. 1 Squadron, January 1989

- Royal Aircraft Factory B.E.2/B.E.12 (1916–1918)
- Martinsyde G.100/G.102 (1916–1918)
- Royal Aircraft Factory R.E.8 (1917–1918)
- Bristol F.2 Fighter (1917–1919)
- Handley Page O/400 (1918)
- Airco DH.9/DH.9A (1925–1929)
- Royal Aircraft Factory S.E.5 (1925–1928)
- Westland Wapiti (1929–1936)
- Hawker Demon (1935–1939)
- Bristol Bulldog (1935–1937)
- Avro Anson (1939–1940)
- Lockheed Hudson (1940–1942)
- Bristol Beaufort (1943–1945)
- De Havilland Mosquito (1945–1946)
- Avro Lincoln (1948–1958)
- English Electric Canberra (1958–1970)
- McDonnell Douglas F-4 Phantom II (1970–1973)
- General Dynamics F-111C (1973–2009)
- Boeing F/A-18F Super Hornet (2010–current)
