= List of aircraft of the Royal Australian Air Force =

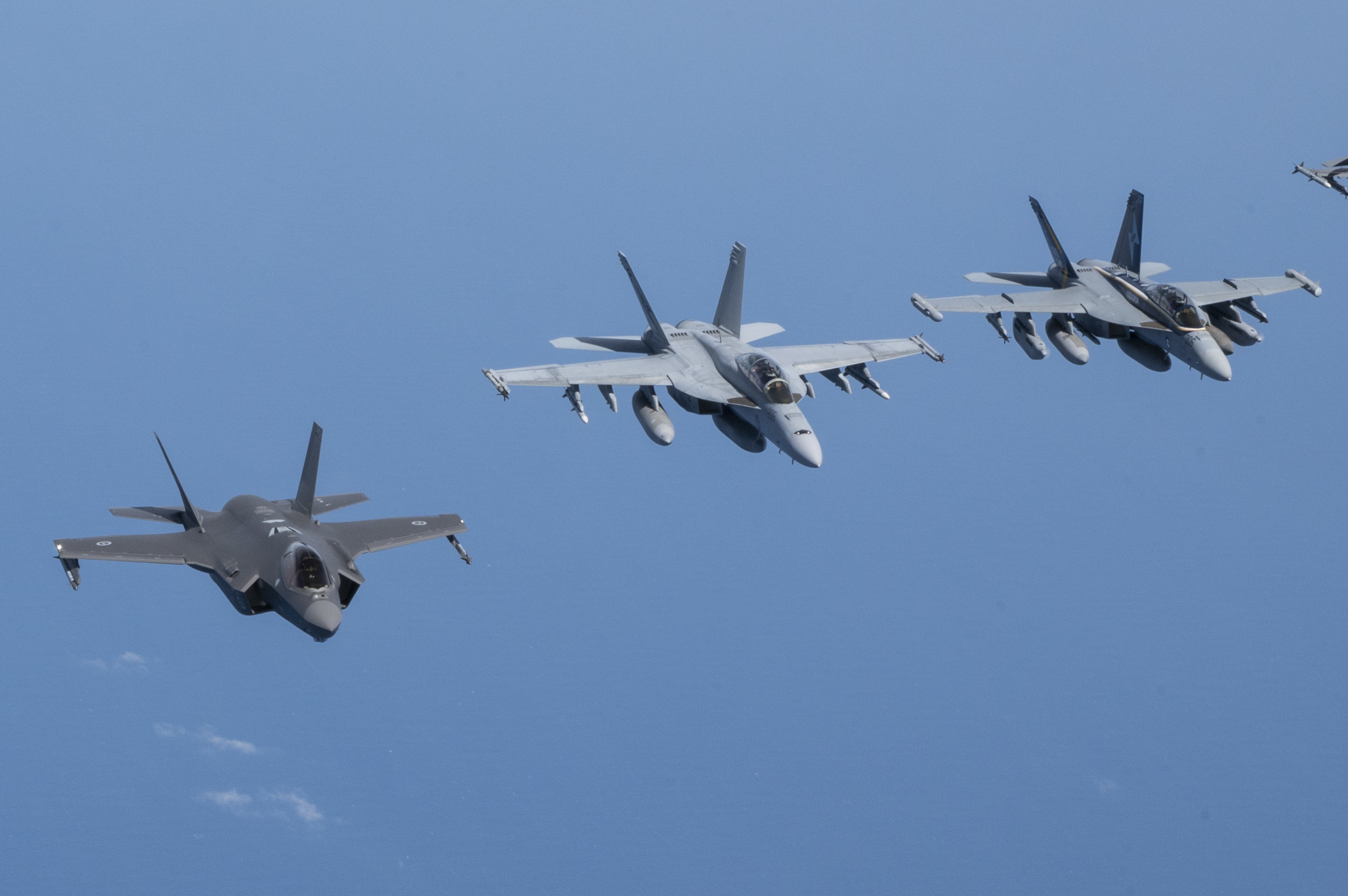
RAAF F-35A Lightning II, F/A-18F Super Hornet and EA-18G Growler combat aircraft flying in formation during 2022

Many aircraft types have served in the Royal Australian Air Force (RAAF) since it was formed in March 1921. This is a list of RAAF aircraft, those types that have served and been retired by the RAAF. It also includes aircraft of the Australian Flying Corps, Australian Air Corps and Australian Air Force. The aircraft are listed in alphabetic order of their RAAF type name, and then in mark order within that type. For the current aircraft of the RAAF, refer to the list of current Royal Australian Air Force aircraft.

== By type ==
Type	Origin	Class	Role	Introduced	Retired	Total	Notes
Avro 504	United Kingdom	biplane	trainer	1916	1928	132	several variants used, including at least 8 504A, 7 504J, and 56 504K
B.E.2a	United Kingdom	biplane	trainer	1914	1918	2	operated by Central Flying School as CFS1 and CFS2
B.E.2c	United Kingdom	biplane	reconnaissance			27	operated by No. 1 Sqn.
B.E.2e	United Kingdom	biplane	trainer		1920	1	operated by 1, 4, and 7 Sqns.; 1 operated by Central Flying School from 1918 to 1920
Blériot XI	France	prop	trainer	1915	1917	1	operated by Central Flying School as CFS6; primarily for ground instruction
Boxkite	United Kingdom	prop	trainer	1913	1917	2	one built by Bristol and second ordered but not delivered; another was built in Australia from parts; operated by Central Flying School as CFS3 and CFS8; first military aircraft built in Australia
Boxkite XV	United Kingdom	prop	trainer	1916	1918	2	built by Grahame-White Aviation Company; operated by Central Flying School
CA-25 Winjeel	Australia	prop	trainer	1955	1995	62 Production + 2 Prototypes	Served as a Central Flying School trainer and then into a FAC (Forward Air Control) role in its final years, replaced by the PAC CT-4A
PAC CT/4 Airtrainer	New Zealand	prop	trainer	1975	1992	51	Served as a Central Flying School trainer, Became replaced by contracted BAE Systems CT-4B's, until BAE contract was lost. Civilian use of CT-4As are high.
CA-26 Sabre	Australia	jet	fighter	1956	1957	1	Experimental development of the F-86 Sabre, led to CA-27 Sabre
CA-27 Sabre Mk.30-32	Australia	jet	fighter	1956	1971	112	license-built by Commonwealth Aircraft Corporation; replaced by the Mirage III
Caudron G.III	France	biplane	trainer	1916	1917	1	operated by Central Flying School
Deperdussin Type A	France	prop	trainer	1913	1918	2	built by British Deperdussin; operated by Central Flying School as CFS4 and CFS5
DH.1a	United Kingdom	biplane	fighter	1916	1916	1	built by Savages; operated by 1 Sqn AFC; returned to UK
DH.5	United Kingdom	biplane	fighter	1917		78	operated by 2 & 6 Sqns AFC
DH.6	United Kingdom	biplane	trainer	1918	1919	28	2 additional aircraft ordered by Central Flying School but lost at sea during delivery; operated by 5, 7, and 8 Sqns RFC
DH.9A	United Kingdom	biplane	light bomber	1920	1930	31	30 acquired as an imperial gift from the United Kingdom; 1 replacement purchased 6 destroyed; 16 scrapped; 9 written-off assigned RAAF serial prefix A1
DHC-4 Caribou	Canada	prop	airlift	1964	2009	29	Operated as transport aircraft and STOL Aircraft throughout the Vietnam war and PNG regions
F.2b Fighter	United Kingdom	biplane	fighter	1918	1919	67	operated by 1, 3, and 7 Sqns. AFC
F-111C Aardvark	United States	jet	medium-range interdictor/ Tactical Strike	1973	2010	24	Ordered in 1963 to replace the ageing English Electric Canberra Bombers. Delivery not received until 1973, RAAF used leased F-4 Phantoms while the U.S. produced the first F-111Cs
F-111G Aardvark	United States	jet	medium-range interdictor/ Tactical Strike	1992	2007	15	former USAF aircraft, attrition replacements for the F-111C
F.E.2b	United Kingdom	biplane	trainer	1917	1920	1	operated by Central Flying School
F.K.3	United Kingdom	biplane	trainer	1917	1917	4	briefly operated by the AFC
Lincoln Mk.30	United Kingdom	prop	bomber	1946	1961	73	20 converted to Mk.31 Lincoln
Lincoln Mk.31	United Kingdom	prop	LRN (long Range Navigation Bomber)	1946	1961	20	"Long Nose" Lincoln was unique to Australian service, featuring a 6' 6" nose extension
Maurice Farman Hydro-Aeroplane	France	floatplane	trainer	1914	1917	1	operated by Central Flying School as CFS7
M.F.7 Longhorn	France	biplane	trainer	1916	1918	1	operated by Central Flying School as CFS15
M.F.11 Shorthorn	France	biplane	trainer	1916	1919	5	operated by Central Flying School
Mirage IIIO(A & F)	France; Australia	jet	interceptor	1964	1988	100	built by Government Aircraft Factories; replaced by the AF-18A Hornet
Mirage III D	France; Australia	jet	operational trainer	1964	1988	16	built by Government Aircraft Factories; replaced by the AF-18B Hornet
Scout D	United Kingdom	biplane	utility	1916	1926	1	operated by Central Flying School and No. 1 Flying Training School RAAF
UH-1B Iroquois	United States	helicopter	utility transport	1962	1989	24	replaced by the S-70 Black Hawk
UH-1D Iroquois	United States	helicopter	utility transport	1966	1989	8	replaced by the S-70 Black Hawk
UH-1H Iroquois	United States	helicopter	utility transport	1968	1989	34	replaced by the S-70 Black Hawk

== Australian Central Flying School 1913–1919 ==
Aircraft type	Variant	Origin	Role	Service Period	Notes
Airco DH.6	DH.6	United Kingdom	Two-seat primary trainer biplane	1918–1919	Nine aircraft
Avro 504	Avro 504K	United Kingdom	Two-seat trainer biplane	1919–1920	20 aircraft
Bleriot XI	Bleriot XI	France	Trainer aircraft	1915–1917	One aircraft was donated to the Australian Central Flying School in 1915.
Bristol Boxkite	Boxkite	United Kingdom	Two-seat trainer biplane	1912–1918	Two aircraft
Bristol Scout	Scout D	United Kingdom	Single-seat trainer biplane	1916–1926	One ex-Royal Naval Air Service aircraft
Caudron G.3	G.3	France	Two-seat trainer biplane	1916–1918	One aircraft
Deperdussin Type A	Type A	France	Single-seat trainer aircraft	1913–1914	Two aircraft
Grahame-White Type XV Boxkite	Type XV Boxkite	United Kingdom	Two-seat trainer biplane	1916–1918	Two aircraft
Maurice Farman Seaplane	Seaplane	France	Two-seat seaplane	1914–1917	One aircraft
Maurice Farman MF.7 Longhorn	MF.7 Shorthorn	France	Two-seat trainer biplane	1916–1917	One aircraft
Maurice Farman MF.11 Shorthorn	MF.11 Shorthorn	France	Two-seat trainer biplane	1917–1919	Four aircraft
Royal Aircraft Factory B.E.2	B.E.2a, B.E.2b	United Kingdom	Two-seat trainer biplane	1912–1920	Three aircraft
Royal Aircraft Factory F.E.2	F.E.2b	United Kingdom	Two-seat trainer biplane	1917–1920	One aircraft was donated to the Australian Central Flying School in 1917.
Sopwith Pup	Pup	United Kingdom	Single-seat fighter trainer biplane	1919–1920	12 aircraft

== Australian Flying Corps 1913–1920 ==
Aircraft type	Variant	Origin	Role	Service period	Notes
Airco DH.1	DH.1a	United Kingdom	Two-seat fighter scout biplane	1916	One aircraft. Operated by No. 1 Squadron
Airco DH.5	DH.5	United Kingdom	Single-seat fighter scout biplane	1917-?	68 aircraft. Operated by No. 2 Squadron and No. 6 (Training) Squadron
Airco DH.6	DH.6	United Kingdom	Two-seat primary trainer biplane	1917–1918	68 aircraft. Operated by No. No. 5 (Training) Squadron and No. 7 (Training) Squadron
Armstrong Whitworth F.K.3 Little Ark	F.K.3	United Kingdom	Two-seat trainer, obsolete reconnaissance, light bomber biplane	1917 only	Operated by No. 3 squadron
Avro 504	504A; 504J; 504K	United Kingdom	Two-seat elementary trainer biplane	1917–1919	Operated by Nos 5, 6, 7 and 8 Training Squadrons
Bristol F.2 Fighter	F.2B Fighter	United Kingdom	Two-seat reconnaissance, fighter biplane	1916–1918	676 aircraft. Operated by No. 1 Squadron, No. 3 Squadron and No. 7 (Training) Squadron.
Bristol Scout	Scout C Scout D	United Kingdom	Single-seat fighter scout, reconnaissance, trainer biplane	1916-?	Ten aircraft. Operated by No. 1 Squadron and No. 6 (Training) Squadron
Caudron G.3	G.3	France	Two-seat reconnaissance biplane	1915 only	Two aircraft. Operated by the Mesopotamian Half Flight
Curtiss JN-4 Jenny	JN-4 Jenny	United States	Two-seat primary trainer biplane	1917-?	
Handley Page 0/400	0/400	United Kingdom	Three-seat twin-engine heavy bomber biplane	1918 only	One aircraft. Operated by No. 1 Squadron in Palestine.
Martinsyde S.1 Scout	S.1 Scout	United Kingdom	Single-seat, reconnaissance, scout biplane	1915–1916	Four aircraft. Operated by the Mesopotamian Half Flight
Martinsyde Elephant	G.100 Elephant; G.102 Elephant	United Kingdom	Single-seat bomber, reconnaissance, obsolete fighter scout biplane	1916–1918	Operated by No. 1 Squadron in Egypt and Palestine.
Maurice Farman MF.7 Longhorn	MF.7 Longhorn	France	Two-seat reconnaissance biplane	1915 only	One aircraft. Operated by the Mesopotamian Half Flight
Maurice Farman MF.11 Shorthorn	MF.11 Shorthorn	France	Two-seat trainer, obsolete reconnaissance, light bomber biplane	1915–1916	23 aircraft. Operated by No. 5 (Training) Squadron and the Mesopotamian Half Flight
Royal Aircraft Factory B.E.2	B.E.2c; B.E.2e	United Kingdom	Two-seat reconnaissance, artillery spotter, light bomber, trainer biplane	1915–1918	38 aircraft. Operated by No. 1 Squadron in Egypt and Palestine, No. 7 (Training) Squadron in the United Kingdom, plus the Mesopotamian Half Flight.
Royal Aircraft Factory B.E.12	B.E.12; B.E.12a	United Kingdom	Single-seat reconnaissance, light bomber, obsolete fighter biplane	?-1919	Nine aircraft. Operated by No. 1 Squadron in Palestine.
Royal Aircraft Factory R.E.8	R.E.8	United Kingdom	Two-seat reconnaissance, artillery observation, light bomber biplane	1917–1919	Operated by No. 1 Squadron, No. 3 squadron and No. 7 (Training) Squadron
Royal Aircraft Factory S.E.5	SE.5A	United Kingdom	single-seat fighter scout biplane	1917–1919	158 aircraft. Operated by No. 2 Squadron in France, No.5 (Training) Squadron and No. 6 (Training) Squadron in the United Kingdom.
Sopwith Buffalo	3F.1 Buffalo	United Kingdom	Two-seat armoured fighter, reconnaissance biplane	1918	One aircraft. Operated by No. 4 Squadron for test and trials.
Sopwith Camel	1F.1 Camel	United Kingdom	Single-seat fighter scout biplane	1917–1919	186 aircraft. Operated by No. 4 Squadron in France, No. 5 (Training ) Squadron, No. 6 (Training) Squadron and No. 8 (Training) Squadron in the United Kingdom.
Sopwith Pup	Pup	United Kingdom	Single-seat trainer, obsolete fighter-scout biplane	1917–1919	27 aircraft. Operated by Nos 5, 6 and 8 Training Squadrons in the United kingdom.
Sopwith Snipe	7F.1 Snape	United Kingdom	Single-seat fighter-scout biplane	1919 only	68 aircraft. Operated by No. 4 Squadron in France, No. 6 (Training) Squadron and No. 8 (Training) Squadron in the United Kingdom.
Sopwith 1½ Strutter		United Kingdom	trainer, obsolete fighter and reconnaissance biplane	1916–1918	Nine aircraft. Operated by No. 6 (Training ) Squadron in the United Kingdom.

== Australian Air Corps 1920–1921 ==
Aircraft type	Variant	Origin	Role	Service period	Notes
Airco DH.9	Airco DH.9	United Kingdom	Two-seat day bomber, general-purpose biplane	1920–1921	28 Imperial Gift aircraft
Airco DH.9A	Airco DH.9A	United Kingdom	Two-seat day bomber biplane	1920–1921	30 Imperial Gift aircraft
Avro 504	Avro 504K; Avro 504L floatplane	United Kingdom	Two-seat trainer biplane	1920–1921	20 aircraft, plus 35 Imperial Gift aircraft
Bristol Scout	Scout D	United Kingdom		1920–1921	One aircraft
Royal Aircraft Factory B.E.2	B.E.2B	United Kingdom	Two-seat trainer biplane	1920	One aircraft
Royal Aircraft Factory F.E.2	F.E.2b	United Kingdom		1920	one aircraft
Royal Aircraft Factory SE.5	S.E.5A	United Kingdom	Single-seat fighter biplane	1920–1921	35 Imperial Gift aircraft
Sopwith Pup	Pup	United Kingdom	Single-seat fighter trainer biplane	1920–1921	12 aircraft
Vickers Vimy	FB.27A Vimy II	United Kingdom	Twin-engine heavy bomber biplane	1920–1921	One aircraft, civil registration G-EAOU

== Fighters and fighter-bombers ==
Aircraft type	Variant	Origin	Role	Service period	Notes
Royal Aircraft Factory S.E.5A	S.E.5A	United Kingdom	Single-seat fighter biplane	1921–1928	35 aircraft. Imperial Gift aircraft
Bristol Bulldog	Bulldog Mk IIA	United Kingdom	Single-seat day and night fighter biplane	1930–1940	Eight aircraft. Operated by No. 1 Squadron RAAF and No. 2 Squadron RAAF.
Gloster Gauntlet	Gauntlet Mk II	United Kingdom	Single-seat day and night fighter biplane	1940 only	Six aircraft. Operated by No. 3 Squadron RAAF in Egypt. The RAF variant was the Gauntlet Mk II.
Gloster Gladiator	Gladiator Mk II	United Kingdom	Single-seat fighter biplane	1940–1941	30 aircraft. Operated by No. 3 Squadron RAAF during the 1st Libyan campaigns. The RAF variant was the Gladiator Mk II.
Hawker Demon	Demon Mk I Demon Mk II	United Kingdom	Two-seat fighter biplane	1935–1945	64 aircraft.
Boulton Paul Defiant	Defiant Mk I Defiant Mk II	United Kingdom	Two-seat night fighter aircraft	1941 only	18 aircraft. RAF aircraft were operated by No. 456 Squadron RAAF in the United Kingdom. RAF variants were the Defiant Mk I and Mk II.
Curtiss Tomahawk	P-40B Tomahawk Mk IIB	United States	Single-seat fighter bomber aircraft	1941 only	Operated by No. 3 Squadron RAAF in the Syrian and 2nd Libyan campaigns. The RAF variant was the Tomahawk Mk IIB.
Hawker Hurricane	Hurricane Mk I	United Kingdom	Single-seat fighter aircraft	1941, 1942–1946	Only one aircraft served with the RAAF in Australia. Operated by No. 3 Squadron RAAF, No. 450 Squadron RAAF and No. 451 Squadron RAAF in North Africa. RAF variants were the Hurricane Mk I, Mk II, Mk IIB and Mk IIC.
Supermarine Spitfire	Spitfire F Mk VC; Spitfire F Mk VIII; Spitfire HF Mk VIII; Spitfire LF Mk VIII	United Kingdom	Single-seat fighter aircraft	1941–1945	928 plus aircraft. RAF aircraft were operated by Nos 451, 452, 453 and 457 Australian squadrons. RAF variants were the Spitfire Mk I, Mk IIA, Mk VB, Mk VC, Mk VIII, Mk IX, Mk IXB, Mk IXE, LF Mk XIV, LF MK XVI, F Mk 14.
Brewster Buffalo	Buffalo Mk I	United States	Single-seat fighter aircraft	1941–1943	63 aircraft. RAF aircraft were operated by No. 21 Squadron RAAF and No. 453 Squadron RAAF.
Bell Airacobra	P-39D Airacobra; P-39F Airacobra; P-400 Airacobra Mk I	United States	Single-seat fighter aircraft	1942–1943	22 aircraft. Loaned to the RAAF by the USAAF.
DAP/Bristol Beaufighter	Beaufighter Mk 21	United Kingdom; Australia	Two-seat twin-engine strike fighter aircraft	1942–1957	581 aircraft
Bristol Beaufighter	Beaufighter MK IC; Beaufighter Mk VIC; Beaufighter TF Mk X Beaufighter Mk XIC	United Kingdom	Two-seat twin-engine strike fighter aircraft		RAF aircraft were operated by No. 455 Squadron RAAF and No. 456 Squadron RAAF. RAF variants were the Beaufighter Mk IIF, Mk VI and TF Mk X.
Curtiss Kittyhawk	P-40E Kittyhawk Mk IA; P-40K Kittyhawk Mk III; P-40M Kittyhawk Mk III; P-40N Kittyhawk Mk VI	United States	Single-seat fighter-bomber aircraft	1942–1947	848 plus aircraft. RAF aircraft were operated by No. 3 Squadron RAAF and No. 450 Squadron RAAF. RAF variants were the Kittyhawk Mk I, Mk II, Mk IIA, Mk III and Mk IV.
CAC Boomerang	CA-12 Boomerang Mk I CA-13 Boomerang Mk II; CA-14 Boomerang; CA-14A prototype CA-19 Boomerang	Australia	Single-seat interceptor, ground-attack fighter aircraft	1942–1946	250 aircraft
De Havilland Mosquito	Mosquito F MK II; Mosquito T Mk III; Mosquito FB Mk VI; Mosquito PR Mk XVI; Mosquito FB Mk 40; Mosquito PR Mk 40; Mosquito PR Mk 41; Mosquito T Mk 43	United Kingdom; Australia	Twin-engine two-seat long-range high-altitude fighter bomber, photographic reconnaissance aircraft	1942–1954	285 plus aircraft. RAF aircraft were operated by No. 456 Squadron RAAF and No. 464 Squadron RAAF. RAF variants were the Mosquito NF Mk II, T Mk III, FB Mk VI, NF Mk XVII and NF Mk 30.
North American Mustang	P-51D Mustang; P-51K Mustang; CA-17 Mustang Mk 20; CA-18 Mustang Mk 21; CA-18 Mustang PR Mk 22; CA-18 Mustang Mk 23	United States; Australia	Single-seat long-range fighter aircraft	1944–1960	499 plus aircraft. RAF aircraft were operated by No. 3 Squadron RAAF and No. 450 Squadron RAAF between 1944 and 1945. RAF variants were the Mustang Mk III, Mk IV and Mk IVA. The CAC Mustangs were operated by No. 3 Squadron RAAF, No. 4 Squadron RAAF, No. 21 Squadron RAAF, No. 22 Squadron RAAF, No. 23 Squadron RAAF, No. 24 Squadron RAAF, No. 25 Squadron RAAF, No. 75 Squadron RAAF, No. 76 Squadron RAAF, No. 77 Squadron RAAF and No. 82 Squadron RAAF. See CAC Mustang.
De Havilland Vampire	Vampire F Mk 1 Vampire F Mk 2 Vampire FB Mk 5	United Kingdom	Single-seat fighter, fighter bomber aircraft	1948–1957	Three aircraft
De Havilland Vampire	Vampire F MK 30; Vampire FB Mk 31; Vampire T Mk 33; Vampire TMk 34; Vampire T Mk 34A; Vampire T Mk 35; Vampire T Mk 35A	United Kingdom; Australia	Single-seat fighter, fighter bomber aircraft	1949–1970	193 aircraft. The Vampire were operated by No. 21 Squadron RAAF, No. 22 Squadron RAAF, No. 23 Squadron RAAF, No. 25 Squadron RAAF, No. 75 Squadron RAAF and No. 76 Squadron RAAF. Also operated No. 2 Operational Conversion Unit RAAF and the Central Flying School RAAF.
Gloster Meteor	Meteor F Mk 3 Meteor F Mk 8 Meteor NF MK 11; Meteor T Mk 7 Meteor U Mk 21A	United Kingdom	Single-seat interceptor, ground attack fighter aircraft	1946–1947, 1951–1963	111 aircraft. The Meteor were operated by No. 22 Squadron RAAF, No. 23 Squadron RAAF, No. 75 Squadron RAAF and No. 77 Squadron RAAF.
CAC/North American Sabre	CA-26 Prototype; CA-27 Sabre Mk 30; CA-27 Sabre Mk 31; CA-27 Sabre Mk 32	United States; Australia	Single-seat jet fighter aircraft	1954–1971	112 aircraft. The CAC Sabres were operated by No. 3 Squadron RAAF, No. 75 Squadron RAAF, No. 76 Squadron RAAF and No. 77 Squadron RAAF. Also operated by No. 2 Operational Conversion Unit RAAF and No. 5 Operational Training Unit RAAF.
GAF/Dassault Mirage III	Mirage IIID; Mirage IIIO(A); Mirage IIIO(F)	France; Australia	Single-seat interceptor fighter, ground-attack fighter-bomber aircraft	1964–1988	116 aircraft. The Mirage III were operated by No. 3 Squadron RAAF, No. 75 Squadron RAAF, No. 76 Squadron RAAF, No. 77 Squadron RAAF and No. 79 Squadron RAAF. Also operated by No. 2 Operational Conversion Unit RAAF and the Aircraft Research and Development Unit RAAF.
GAF/McDonnell Douglas F/A-18 Hornet	F/A-18A Hornet; F/A-18B Hornet	United States; Australia	Single-seat multi-role fighter-attack aircraft	1985–2021	75 aircraft. The Hornets were operated by No. 2 Operational Conversion Unit RAAF, No. 3 Squadron RAAF, No. 75 Squadron RAAF and No. 77 Squadron RAAF. See McDonnell Douglas F/A-18 Hornet in Australian service
Boeing F/A-18F Super Hornet	F/A-18F Super Hornet	United States	Two-seat multi-role fighter-attack aircraft	2010–present	
Lockheed Martin F-35 Lightning II	F-35A	United States	single-seat multi-role fighter aircraft	2014–present	
Boeing EA-18G Growler	EF-18A Growler	United States	Two-seat electronic warfare aircraft	2015–present	12 Aircraft

== Bombers ==
Aircraft type	Variant	Origin	Role	Service period	Notes
Airco DH.9	DH.9	United Kingdom	Two-seat day bomber, general-purpose biplane	1921–1930	28 aircraft. Imperial Gift aircraft
Airco DH.9A	DH.9A	United Kingdom	Two-seat day bomber biplane	1921–1929	30 aircraft
Vickers Vimy	FB.27A Vimy II	United Kingdom	Twin-engine heavy bomber	1921-?	One aircraft
Westland Wapiti	Wapiti Mk IA; Wapiti Mk IIA	United Kingdom	Two-seat general-purpose, light bomber biplane	1929–1943	44 aircraft. Used as trainer and target tug aircraft.
Lockheed Hudson	Hudson Mk I Hudson Mk II; Hudson Mk IIIA; Hudson IV; Hudson Mk IVA	United States	Twin-engine general reconnaissance bomber aircraft, with a crew of five	1940–1948	RAF aircraft were operated by No. 8 Squadron RAAF and No. 459 Squadron RAAF. RAF variants were the Hudson Mk III, Mk IIIA, Mk V and Mk VI
DAP/Bristol Beaufort	Beaufort Mk V Beaufort Mk VA; Beaufort Mk VI; Beaufort Mk VII; Beaufort Mk VIII; Beaufort Mk IX	United Kingdom; Australia	Twin-engine torpedo bomber aircraft, with a crew of four	1941–1946	701 aircraft
Vultee Vengeance	Vengeance Mk I Vengeance Mk IA; Vengeance Mk II; Vengeance Mk IV	United States	Two-seat dive bomber aircraft	1942–1946	342 aircraft. See Vultee Vengeance in Australian service
Douglas Boston	DB-7B Boston Mk III; A-20A Boston; A-20C Boston; A-20G Boston	United States	Twin-engine light attack bomber aircraft, with a crew of three	1942–1945	69 aircraft
Vickers Wellington	Wellington Mk IC; Wellington Mk III; Wellington Mk IV; Wellington Mk VIII; Wellington Mk X Wellington Mk XI; Wellington Mk XII; Wellington Mk XIII; Wellington Mk XIV	United Kingdom	Twin-engine long-range medium bomber aircraft, with a crew of six	1941–1945	71 aircraft. RAF aircraft were operated by Nos 458, 460 and 466 Australian Squadrons. RAF variants were the Wellington Mk IC, Mk III, Mk IV, Mk VIII, Mk X, Mk XI, Mk XIII and Mk XIV
Handley Page Hampden	Hampden Mk I Hampden TB Mk I	United Kingdom	Four-seat twin-engine medium bomber, torpedo bomber	1941–1942	70 aircraft. RAF aircraft were operated by No. 455 Squadron RAAF. RAF variants were the Hampden Mk I and TB Mk I.
Bristol Blenheim	Blenheim Mk I Blenheim Mk IV; Blenheim Mk V	United Kingdom	Three-seat twin-engine light bomber aircraft	1942–1943	RAF aircraft were operated by No. 454 Squadron RAAF and No. 459 Squadron RAAF in the Mediterranean.
Handley Page Halifax	Halifax Mk II; Halifax Mk III	United Kingdom	Four-engine heavy bomber aircraft, with a crew of seven	1942–1945	300 aircraft. RAF aircraft were operated by Nos 460, 462 and 466 Australian squadrons. RAF variants were the Halifax Mk II, Mk III and VI
Lockheed Ventura	RB-34A Ventura; PV-1 Ventura	United States	Twin-engine general reconnaissance bomber aircraft, with a crew of five	1942–1946	92 aircraft. RAF aircraft were operated by No. 459 Squadron RAAF and No. 464 Squadron RAAF from 1942 to 1943. RAF variants were the Ventura Mk I, Mk II and Mk V.
Martin Baltimore	Baltimore Mk III; Baltimore Mk IIIA; Baltimore Mk IV; Baltimore Mk V	United States	Four-seat twin-engine light, medium bomber aircraft	1943–1945	71 plus aircraft. RAF aircraft were operated by No. 454 Squadron RAAF and No. 459 Squadron RAAF. RAF variants were the Baltimore Mk III, Mk IIIA, Mk IV and Mk V
North American Mitchell	B-25D Mitchell; B-25J Mitchell Mk III	United States	Twin-engine medium bomber aircraft, with a crew of 5 or 6	1942–1946	50 aircraft
Avro Manchester	Manchester Mk I	United Kingdom	Twin-engine heavy bomber aircraft	1942 only	Operated by No. 460 Squadron RAAF. The RAF variant was the Manchester Mk I.
Avro Lancaster	Lancaster B Mk I	United Kingdom	Four-engine heavy bomber aircraft, with a crew of seven	1942–1946	83 plus aircraft. Only two aircraft served with the RAAF in Australia. RAF aircraft were operated by Nos 460, 463 and 467 Australian squadrons. The RAF variants were the Lancaster Mk I and Mk III. See G for George
Consolidated Liberator	B-24D Liberator; B-24J Liberator; B-24L Liberator; B-24M Liberator	United States	Four-engine heavy bomber aircraft	1944–1948	277 aircraft. RAF aircraft were operated by No. 466 Squadron RAAF and No. 467 Squadron RAAF in 1945. See B-24 Liberators in Australian service
GAF/Avro Lincoln	Lincoln Mk 30; Lincoln Mk 30A; Lincoln GR Mk 31; Lincoln MR Mk 31	United Kingdom; Australia	Four-engine long-range heavy bomber aircraft, with a crew of seven	1946–1961	73 aircraft. The Lincoln was operated by Nos No. 1 Squadron RAAF, No. 2 Squadron RAAF, No. 6 Squadron RAAF, No. 11 Squadron RAAF, No. 12 Squadron RAAF and Lincoln Conversion Flight RAAF.
GAF/English Electric Canberra	Canberra B Mk 2 Canberra Mk 20; Canberra Mk 21; Canberra T Mk 4	United Kingdom; Australia	Twin-engine tactical bomber aircraft	1951–1982	55 aircraft. The Canberra was operated by No. 1 Squadron RAAF, No. 2 Squadron RAAF and No. 6 Squadron RAAF. Also operated by No. 1 Operational Conversion Unit RAAF, Aircraft Research and Development Unit RAAF and No. 1 Long Range Flight RAAF.
McDonnell Douglas F-4 Phantom II	F-4E Phantom II	United States	Two-seat ground attack fighter-bomber, air superiority fighter aircraft	1970–1973	24 aircraft. The F-4 Phantom was operated by No. 1 Squadron RAAF and No. 6 Squadron RAAF. See McDonnell Douglas F-4 Phantom II in Australian service
General Dynamics F-111C Aardvark	F-111A Aardvark; F-111C Aardvark; F-111G Aardvark; RF-111C Aardvark	United States	Two-seat long-range tactical strike, interdictor, reconnaissance aircraft	1973–2010	43 aircraft. The F-111C was operated by No. 1 Squadron RAAF, No. 6 Squadron RAAF and the Aircraft Research and Development Unit RAAF.

== Maritime Reconnaissance ==
Aircraft type	Variant	Origin	Role	Service period	Notes
Fairey IIID	Fairey IIID	United Kingdom	Three-seat spotter-reconnaissance, survey seaplane	1921–1928	RAAF on behalf of the RAN. Six aircraft
Supermarine Seagull	Seagull Mk III	United Kingdom	Three-seat spotter-reconnaissance, survey amphibian aircraft	1926–1936	RAAF on behalf of the RAN. Nine aircraft
Supermarine Southampton	Southampton Mk I	United Kingdom	General reconnaissance flying boat aircraft, with a crew of five	1928–1939	Two aircraft
Supermarine Walrus/Seagull V	Seagull Mk V Walrus Mk I Walrus Mk III	United Kingdom	Three-seat air/sea rescue, maritime patrol amphibian aircraft	1935–1947	RAAF on behalf of the RAN. 61 aircraft
Short S.23 Empire	S.23 C Class Empire Flying Boat	United Kingdom	Four-engine 24-passenger flying boat airliner	1939–1943	Five aircraft. Impressed into RAAF service for transport and air-ambulance duties in 1939. See Qantas fleet history.
Short S.26 G Class Flying Boat	S.26/M G Class Flying Boat	United Kingdom	Four-engine 38-passenger flying boat airliner	1941 only	Three aircraft. RAF aircraft were operated by No. 10 Squadron RAAF
Short Sunderland	Sunderland Mk I	United Kingdom	Four-engine general-reconnaissance flying boat aircraft, with a crew of 13.	1939–1946	146 aircraft. RAF aircraft were operated by No. 10 Squadron RAAF and No. 461 Squadron RAAF. RAF variants were the Sunderland Mk I, Mk II, Mk III and Mk V.
Consolidated Catalina	PBY-4 Catalina; PBY-5 Catalina; PBY-5A Catalina; PB2B-1 Catalina; PB2B-2 Catalina	United States	Twin-engine general reconnaissance flying-boat aircraft, with a crew of 8 or 9.	1940–1950	168 aircraft. The Catalina was operated by No. 10 Squadron RAAF. See Consolidated PBY Catalina in Australian service
Fairey Swordfish	Swordfish Mk I	United States	Three-seat torpedo-bomber, reconnaissance, anti-submarine biplane	1942 only	Six aircraft. Used by No. 25 Squadron RAAF in Western Australia.
Vought Kingfisher	OS2U-3 Kingfisher	United States	Two-seat reconnaissance aircraft	1942–1948	18 aircraft
Lockheed Neptune	P2V-4 Neptune; P2V-5 (P-2E) Neptune; P2V-7 (SP-2H) Neptune	United States	Twin-engine maritime reconnaissance, patrol and anti-submarine aircraft	1951–1977	24 aircraft. The Neptune was operated by No. 10 Squadron RAAF and No. 11 Squadron RAAF.
Lockheed P-3 Orion	P-3B Orion; P-3C Orion; AP-3C Orion; TAP-3B Orion	United States	Four-engine maritime patrol aircraft	1968–present	31 aircraft. The P-3 Orions are operated by No. 10 Squadron RAAF and No. 11 Squadron RAAF.
Lockheed AP-3C Orion	AP-3C Orion	United States	Four-engine maritime patrol aircraft	2002–present	
Boeing P-8 Poseidon	P-8A Poseidon	United States		2016–present	

== Army Cooperation ==
Aircraft type	Variant	Origin	Role	Service period	Notes
Hawker Audax	Audax	United Kingdom	Two-seat army co-operation, communications biplane	1940–1941	Used by Australian squadrons in North Africa.
Westland Lysander	Lysander Mk I Lysander Mk II	United Kingdom	Two-seat army co-operation, communications aircraft	1940	Used by No. 3 Squadron RAAF in Egypt. Six aircraft
Piper Cub	L-4 Grasshopper	United States	Two-seat light observation, communications aircraft	1943–1944	Borrowed from the USAAF, used by No. 4 Squadron RAAF in New Guinea. Two aircraft?
Taylorcraft Auster AOP	Auster Mk III; Auster Mk V Auster AOP.6	United Kingdom	Two-seat air observation post, communications aircraft	1944–1959	58 aircraft. The Austers were operated by No. 16 Air Observation Post Flight RAAF and No. 17 Air Observation Post Flight RAAF
Stinson Sentinel	L-5 Sentinel	United States	Two-seat light observation, communications aircraft	1944–1946	One aircraft was borrowed from the USAAF in 1944.
Cessna 180	Cessna 180A; Cessna 180D; Cessna 180E	United States	Two to four-seat observation, communications aircraft	1959–1964	15 aircraft. The Cessna 180 was operated by No. 16 Army Light Aircraft Squadron (Australia). The aircraft were transferred to the Australian Army in 1964.

== Trainers ==
Aircraft type	Variant	Origin	Role	Service period	Notes
Bristol Scout D	Scout D	United Kingdom		1921–1926	One aircraft
Avro 504	Avro 504K; Avro 504L floatplane	United Kingdom; Australia	Two-seat trainer biplane	1922–1928	61 aircraft. Imperial Gift aircraft
Sopwith Pup	Pup	United Kingdom	Single-seat fighter trainer biplane	1922–1925	11 aircraft used as fighter trainers
De Havilland Cirrus Moth	D.H.60 Cirrus I Moth; D.H.60X Cirrus Moth	United Kingdom	Two-seat elementary trainer biplane	1926–1935	34 aircraft
De Havilland Gipsy Moth	D.H.60G Gipsy Moth; D.H.60G-III Moth Major; D.H.60M (Metal) Moth	United Kingdom; Australia	Two-seat elementary trainer biplane	1930–1946	98 aircraft
Avro Cadet	Cadet Mk II	United Kingdom	Two-seat intermediate trainer biplane	1935–1945	34 aircraft
Airspeed Oxford	Oxford Mk I Oxford Mk II	United Kingdom	Twin-engine three-seat advanced trainer aircraft	1940–1953	391 aircraft
de Havilland Dragon	DH.84 Dragon Mk I DH.84 Dragon Mk II; DH.84 Dragon III	United Kingdom; Australia	Twin-engine six or eight passenger feeder airliner biplane	1940–1945	98 aircraft. Built and impressed for trainer and communications duties with the RAAF.
Avro Anson	Anson GR Mk I Anson Mk XII; Anson Mk XIV; Anson T Mk I	United Kingdom	Twin-engine general reconnaissance bomber, trainer aircraft	1937–1955	1020 aircraft
CAC Wirraway	CA-1 Wirraway; CA-3 Wirraway; CA-5 Wirraway; CA-7 Wirraway; CA-8 Wirraway; CA-9 Wirraway; CA-16 Wirraway	Australia	Two-seat trainer, general purpose aircraft	1939–1958	755 aircraft
De Havilland Tiger Moth	DH.82A Tiger Moth	United Kingdom; Australia	Two-seat elementary trainer biplane	1940–1957	885 aircraft. Tiger Moths were operated by No. 22 Squadron RAAF, No. 23 Squadron RAAF, No. 24 Squadron RAAF and No. 25 Squadron RAAF.
De Havilland Moth Minor	DH.94 Moth Minor	United Kingdom; Australia	Two-seat elementary trainer aircraft	1940–1945	42 aircraft used in the Empire Air Training Scheme.
Douglas Dolphin		United States	Twin-engine eight-seat amphibian aircraft	1940–1944	Four civilian aircraft were impressed into RAAF service in 1940.
Fairey Battle		United Kingdom	Three-seat light bomber aircraft	1940–1949	Obsolete bomber aircraft. 366 aircraft used in the Empire Air Training Scheme.
CAC Wackett Trainer	CA-2 Prototypes; CA-6 Wackett Trainer	Australia	Two-seat intermediate trainer aircraft	1940–1946	202 aircraft
Ryan STM	Ryan STM-2	United States	Two-seat primary trainer aircraft	1942–1945	34 aircraft
CAC Winjeel	CA-22 prototype CA-25 Winjeel	Australia	Two or three-seat basic trainer aircraft	1951–1994	64 aircraft
RFD Winged Target		United Kingdom	Experimental towed target gliders	1950s	Ten gliders
Hawker Siddeley HS.748	HS 748 Series 2	United Kingdom	Twin-engine navigation trainer aircraft	1966–2004	Ten aircraft
CAC/Macchi MB-326H	CAC CA-30, MB-326H	Italy; Australia	Two-seat basic and advanced jet trainer aircraft	1968–2001	87 aircraft
PAC CT/4 Airtrainer	CT/4A Airtrainer	New Zealand	Two-seat primary trainer aircraft	1975–1993	51 aircraft
Pilatus PC-9	PC-9/A	Switzerland; Australia	Two-seat advanced pilot trainer, aerobatics, forward air control aircraft	1987–2019	67 aircraft
Beechcraft Super King Air (RAAF)		United States	Twin-engine navigation, specialised trainer aircraft	B200 1997–2003, B350 2003–present	
BAe Hawk 127	Hawk 127	United Kingdom; Australia	Two-seat advanced jet trainer, lead-in fighter trainer, light attack fighter aircraft	2000–present	33 aircraft
Pilatus PC-21	PC-21	Switzerland	Two-set pilot trainer aircraft	2016–present	

== Australian Defence Force Basic Flying Training School 1993–2019 ==
Aircraft	Variants	Origin	Role	Service period	Notes
Mudry CAP 10	CAP 10B	France	Two-seat aerobatic aircraft	2005–2019	Three aircraft
PAC CT/4 Airtrainer	CT/4A, CT/4B, CT/4E	New Zealand	Two-seat primary trainer aircraft	1993–2019	
Piper PA-34 Seneca	PA-34-220T	United States	Twin-engined light aircraft	2005–2019	Two aircraft

== Helicopters ==
Aircraft type	Variant	Origin	Role	Service period	Notes
Sikorsky S-51 Dragonfly	S-51 Dragonfly	United States	Four-seat communications, casualty evacuation helicopter	1947–1964	Three helicopters.
Bristol Sycamore	Sycamore Mk 3 Sycamore Mk 14	United Kingdom	Two to five seat general-purpose helicopter	1951–1965	Used for general support duties at the Woomera Rocket Range in South Australia. Two helicopters.
Bell UH-1 Iroquois	UH-1B Iroquois; UH-1D Iroquois; UH-1H Iroquois	United States	Multi-role utility transport helicopter	1962–1990	66 helicopters. The UH-1 Iroquois were operated by Nos No. 5 Squadron RAAF, No. 9 Squadron RAAF, No. 35 Squadron RAAF and the Aircraft Research and Development Unit RAAF. The Iroquois were transferred to the Australian Army in 1990.
Bell 47 Sioux	Bell 47G-3B-1 Sioux; Bell 47G-2 Sioux; Bell 47G-2A Sioux	United States	Three-seat utility and training helicopter	1961–1965	31 helicopters. The Bell 47 Sioux was operated by No. 16 Army Light Aircraft Squadron (Australia). The Bell 47s were transferred to the Australian Army in 1965.
Aerospatiale Alouette III	SA.316B Alouette III	France	Seven-seat general-purpose helicopter	1964–1966	Three helicopters. Used for general support duties at the Woomera Rocket Range in South Australia.
Boeing CH-47 Chinook	CH-47C Chinook	United States	Twin-rotor medium-lift transport helicopter	1974–1989	12 helicopters. Operated by No. 12 Squadron RAAF. The Chinooks were transferred to the Australian Army in 1989. See Boeing CH-47 Chinook in Australian service
Bell AH-1 Cobra	AH-1G HueyCobra	United States	Two-seat attack helicopter	Nil	Zero helicopters. Not ordered.
Aerospatiale AS.350B Squirrel	AS.350B Squirrel	France	Two-crew light utility helicopter	1984–1990	18 helicopters. Transferred to the Australian Defence Force Helicopter School in 1990.
Sikorsky S-70A Blackhawk	S-70A-9 Blackhawk	United States	Multi-role battlefield transport helicopter, with a crew of four and capable of carrying 10 troops	1988–1989	8 UH-60L (S-70A-9) helicopters. Transferred to Australian Army in 1989.

== Reconnaissance and intelligence ==
Aircraft type	Variant	Origin	Role	Service period	Notes
Republic Lancer	P-43A Lancer	United States	Single-seat fighter, photographic reconnaissance aircraft	1942–1943	Eight P-43A-1 Lancer's were provided for service with the No. 1 Photographic Reconnaissance Unit. Three were written off in accidents, with the rest returned to the United States Army Air Forces in 1943.
Brewster F2A Buffalo		United States		1942–1944	Five Brewster F2A Buffalo's were provided for service with the No. 1 Photographic Reconnaissance Unit. Four were written off and the remaining aircraft was returned to the United States Army Air Forces in 1944.
Lockheed Lightning	P-38E Lightning	United States	Single-seat twin-engine long-range high-altitude fighter, photographic reconnaissance aircraft	1942–1944	Three P-38E's were transferred from the United States Army Air Forces for service with No. 1 Photographic Reconnaissance Unit. All three were written off in accidents.
CAC Wirraway		Australia			Served with the No. 87 (Photo Reconnaissance) Squadron
de Havilland Mosquito	Mosquito PR Mk 40; Mosquito PR Mk 41	United Kingdom; Australia	Twin-engine long-range high-altitude photographic reconnaissance aircraft		British and Australian built de Havilland Mosquito's served in the Photographic Reconnaissance role.
General Dynamics F-111C	RF-111C	United States	Two-seat long-range reconnaissance aircraft	1973–2010	Four aircraft were purchased.
Dassault Mirage IIIO(A)	Reconnaissance (R)	France	Single-seat reconnaissance aircraft	1969–1988	Reconnaissance noses were fitted to several Mirage aircraft to serve as photography aircraft.
Gates Learjet 35	Learjet 35	United States		1982–1987	Used by the Survey Flight of No. 6 Squadron RAAF. Eight aircraft were leased to the RAAF.
Boeing 737 AEW&C	E-7A Wedgetail	United States	Twin-engine airborne early warning and control aircraft	2009–present	

== Liaison/Communications ==
Aircraft type	Variant	Origin	Role	Service period	Notes
de Havilland DH.50A	DH-50A	United Kingdom	Four-seat communications biplane	1926–1929	One aircraft
de Havilland DH.50A	DH.50A	United Kingdom	Four-seat communications biplane	1943–1945	One aircraft was impressed into military service with the RAAF in 1943.
Fairchild 24	Fairchild 24G; Fairchild 24R	United States	Four-seat communications aircraft	1940–1946	Four civilian aircraft were impressed into RAAF service in 1940.
Miles Aircraft	Miles Falcon Six; Falcon Major; Miles Hawk Major; Miles Merlin	United Kingdom	Communications aircraft	1940–1945	Six civilian aircraft were impressed into RAAF service in 1940.
Percival Vega Gull		United Kingdom	Four-seat sports aircraft	1940–1946	Two civilian aircraft were impressed into RAAF service in 1940.
Stinson Reliant	SR-8B Reliant	United States	Five-seat communications aircraft	1941–1945	One civilian aircraft was impressed into RAAF service in 1941.
Beech 17 Staggerwing		United States	Four-seat communications aircraft	1941–1947	Three civilian aircraft were impressed into RAAF service in 1941.
Cessna Airmaster	C-34 Airmaster	United States	Four-seat communications aircraft	1941–1945	One civilian aircraft was impressed into RAAF service in 1941.
Lockheed Vega	Vega DL-1A	United States	Six-seat light transport aircraft	1941–1944	One civilian aircraft was impressed into RAAF service in 1941.
Junkers Aircraft	Junkers G 31; Junkers W.34d; Junkers W.34f	Germany	Utility transport aircraft	1942–1943	Three civilian aircraft were impressed into RAAF service in 1942.
Waco YQC-6	YQC-6	United States	Five-seat cabin biplane	1942–1944	One aircraft. Impressed for communications duties with the RAAF in 1942.
Noorduyn Norseman	UC-61A Norseman Mk VI	Canada	Ten-seat utility transport aircraft	1943–1946	14 aircraft
Percival Prince	Prince Mk III	United Kingdom	Twin-engine eight-passenger light transport aircraft	1952–1957	Three aircraft were used at the Long Range Weapons Establishment, Woomera, South Australia.

== Transport and utility ==
Type	Variant	Origin	Role	Dates in Service	Notes
de Havilland Dragon Rapide	DH.89 Dragon Rapide	United Kingdom	Twin-engine aerial survey biplane	1935–1938	One aircraft. Used by the RAAF in the 1930s for aerial surveying.
de Havilland Dragon Rapide	DH.89 Dragon Rapide	United Kingdom	Twin-engine eight or nine seat passenger airliner biplane	1940–1944	Seven aircraft. Impressed into RAAF service for training and communications duties in 1940.
Wackett / Tugan Gannet		Australia	Twin-engine seven-seat transport, photographic survey, air ambulance aircraft	1935–1946	Six aircraft
de Havilland Express	DH.86A Express; DH.86B Express	United Kingdom	Four-engine ten-seat transport biplane	1939–1945	Eight aircraft. Operated by No. 1 Air Ambulance Unit RAAF in the Mediterranean.
de Havilland Fox Moth	DH.83 Fox Moth	United Kingdom	Five-seat light transport biplane	1941–1945	Four aircraft
Bristol Bombay	Bombay Mk I	United Kingdom	Twin-engine medium bomber, troop transport aircraft	1942–1944	RAF aircraft were operated by No. 1 Air Ambulance Unit RAAF. Nine aircraft
de Havilland Dragonfly	DH.90	United Kingdom	Twin-engine five-seat light transport biplane	1942 only	One aircraft
De Havilland Australia DHA-G2 Glider	DHA-G2 Glider; DHA-EG1 Glider prototype	Australia	Seven-seat transport glider	1942–1950	Eight aircraft
Dornier Do 24	Dornier Do 24K	Germany	Three-engine reconnaissance, transport flying boat aircraft	1942–1944	Six aircraft
Grumman Goose	G-21A Goose Mk I	United States		1942 only	RAF aircraft were operated by No. 1 Air Ambulance Unit RAAF. One aircraft
Northrop Delta	Delta 1D-5	United States	Eight-seat cabin aircraft	1942–1944	One civilian aircraft was impressed into RAAF service in 1942.
Ford Trimotor	5-AT-C Trimotor; 5-AT-E Trimotor	United States	Three-engine 14 to 15 passenger transport, air ambulance aircraft	1942–1943	Two aircraft
Lockheed Lodestar	C-60 Lodestar; C-60A Lodestar	United States	Twin-engine military transport, air ambulance aircraft, with a crew of three and capable of carrying fourteen passengers	1943–1947	Ten aircraft
Douglas DC-2	Douglas DC-2	United States	Twin-engine 14 passenger medium transport aircraft	1940–1947	14 aircraft
Douglas DC-3	Douglas DC-3	United States	Twin-engine passenger transport aircraft	1939–1940	Four aircraft
Douglas C-47 Dakota	C-47 Dakota; C-47A Dakota; C-47B Dakota; C-49; C-50; C-53 Skytrooper	United States	Twin-engine military transport aircraft, with a crew of three or four and capable of carrying 27 passengers	1943–1999	RAAF 124 aircraft. The Dakotas were operated by No. 30 Squadron RAAF, No. 34 Squadron RAAF, No. 36 Squadron RAAF and No. 38 Squadron RAAF.
Martin Mariner	PBM-3R Mariner	United States	Twin-engine long-range transport flying boat aircraft	1943–1946	12 aircraft
Avro York	York C Mk 1	United Kingdom	Four-engine long-range VIP transport aircraft, with a crew of five to seven	1945–1947	One aircraft. The aircraft was operated by the Governor-General's Flight RAAF. See Royal Australian Air Force VIP aircraft
Percival Proctor	Proctor IV	United Kingdom	Four-seat communications aircraft	1945–1947	One aircraft. The Protor was operatred by the Governor-General's Flight RAAF.
Vickers VC.1 Viking	Viking C Mk 2	United Kingdom	Twin-engine medium transport aircraft	1947–1951	One aircraft
Bristol Freighter	Freighter Mk 21	United Kingdom	Twin-engine convertible passenger / freighter transport aircraft	1949–1967	Four aircraft
De Havilland Canada DHC-2 Beaver	DHC-2 Beaver	Canada	Seven-seat utility transport aircraft	1955–1964	Five aircraft
Convair 440 Metropolitan	CV-440 Metropolitan	United States	Twin-engine medium-range VIP transport aircraft	1956–1968	Two aircraft. Operated by No. 34 Squadron RAAF. See Royal Australian Air Force VIP aircraft
Lockheed C-130 Hercules	C-130A Hercules; C-130E Hercules; C-130H Hercules	United States	Four-engine medium-range, tactical transport aircraft, with a crew of four or five.	1958–present	36 aircraft. The C-130 Hercules was operated by No. 36 Squadron RAAF and No. 37 Squadron RAAF. See Lockheed C-130 Hercules in Australian service
De Havilland Canada DHC-3 Otter	DHC-3 Otter	Canada	14-seat utility transport aircraft	1961–1967	Two aircraft
De Havilland Canada DHC-4 Caribou	DHC-4 Caribou	Canada	Twin-engine light tactical transport aircraft, with a crew of two and capable of carrying 22 troops	1964–2009	28 aircraft. The Caribou was operated by No. 35 Squadron RAAF and No. 38 Squadron RAAF.
Vickers Viscount	Viscount Model 720; Viscount Model 756	United Kingdom	Four-engine VIP transport aircraft	1964–1969	Two aircraft. Operated by No. 34 Squadron RAAF. See Royal Australian Air Force VIP aircraft
BAC One-Eleven	BAC One-Eleven 217EA	United Kingdom	Twin-engine 28-seat VIP transport aircraft	1967–1990	Two aircraft. Operated by No. 34 Squadron RAAF. See Royal Australian Air Force VIP aircraft
Hawker Siddeley HS 748	HS.478 Series 2	United Kingdom	Twin-engine light VIP transport aircraft	1966–2004	Two aircraft. Operated by No. 34 Squadron RAAF. See Royal Australian Air Force VIP aircraft
Dassault Falcon 20	Mystere 20C; Falcon 20c	France	Twin-engine eight-passenger short-range VIP transport aircraft	1967–1989	Three aircraft. Operated by No. 34 Squadron RAAF. See Royal Australian Air Force VIP aircraft
GAF Nomad	Nomad N24A; Nomad N.22B	Australia	Twin-engine utility transport, reconnaissance aircraft, with a crew of two and capable of carrying 11 passengers	RAAF 1989–1993	RAAF three aircraft
Boeing 707	Boeing 707-368C; Boeing 707-338C	United States	Four-engine air-to-air refueling tanker, long-range transport aircraft	1979–2008	Eight aircraft. The Boeing 707s were operated by No. 33 Squadron RAAF. See Qantas fleet history
Dassault Falcon 900	Falcon 900	France	Three-engine 15-passenger VIP transport aircraft	1989–2003	Five aircraft. Operated by No. 34 Squadron RAAF. See Royal Australian Air Force VIP aircraft
Beechcraft Super King Air (Army, RAAF)		United States	Twin-engine utility, light transport aircraft	B200/B200C 1997–2006; B350 2004– (RAAF from 2009)	Australian Army 24 aircraft.
Lockheed Martin C-130J Super Hercules	C-130J Super Hercules	United States	Four-engine medium-range, tactical transport aircraft	1999–present	12 aircraft
Boeing Business Jet/737	737 Boeing Business Jet	United States	Twin-engine special purpose passenger, VIP transport aircraft	2002–present	Two aircraft. See Royal Australian Air Force VIP aircraft
Bombardier Challenger 604	604 Challenger	Canada	Twin-engine special purpose passenger, VIP transport aircraft	2002–present	Three aircraft. See Royal Australian Air Force VIP aircraft
Boeing C-17 Globemaster III	C-17A Globemaster III	United States	Four-engine heavy transport aircraft	2006–present	Eight aircraft. See Boeing C-17 Globemaster III in Australian service
Airbus A330 MRTT/KC-30A	KC-30A Multi Role Tanker Transport	France	Twin-engine air-to-air refueling tanker, long-range transport aircraft	2011–present	
Alenia C-27J Spartan	C-27A Spartan	Italy	Twin-engine battlefield airlifter aircraft	2015–present	
Dassault Falcon 7X	Falcon 7X	France		2019–present	Three aircraft. Royal Australian Air Force VIP aircraft

== Prototypes ==
Aircraft type	Variant	Origin	Role	Service period	Notes
AAC Wamira		Australia	Military trainer		Zero aircraft, none were built. Abandoned military aircraft project. Cancelled in 1986.
Avro 707	Type 707A	United Kingdom	single-seat delta-wing research aircraft	1956	WD280 is housed at the RAAF Museum in Point Cook, Victoria. One aircraft.
BAC Jet Provost	Jet Provost T Mk 2	United Kingdom	Two-sea basic jet trainer aircraft	1959	One aircraft. Used for tests and trials by the RAAF.
Boeing Washington	Washington B Mk 1	United States	Four-engine long-range bomber aircraft, with a crew of ten	1952–1956	Two aircraft. Used for weapons trials at the Long Range Weapons Establishment, Woomera, South Australia. The Washington was the British name for the B-29 Superfortress.
CAC CA-11 Woomera	CA-4 Woomera; CA-11 Woomera	Australia	Three-seat strike reconnaissance and dive-bomber aircraft	1942–1946	Two aircraft.
CAC CA-15 Kangaroo	CA-15 Kangaroo	Australia	Single-seat interceptor fighter aircraft	1946–1950	One aircraft
CAC CA-23		Australia			Zero aircraft, none were built. Abandoned military aircraft project
Curtiss Shrike	A-25A Shrike	United States	Two-seat dive bomber aircraft	1943–1944	Ten aircraft
De Havilland Sea Hornet	Sea Hornet F Mk 20	United Kingdom	Single-seat twin-engine carrier-borne strike fighter aircraft	1948–1950	One aircraft. Acquired for tests and trials.
De Havilland Australia DHA-3 Drover	Drover Mk 1	Australia	Three-engine eight-seat utility transport aircraft	1948–1949	One aircraft (VH-DHA). Operated by the Aircraft Research and Development Unit RAAF
De Havilland Canada DHC-1 Chipmunk		Canada	Two-seat primary trainer aircraft	1948–1949	One aircraft (VH-BFT). Operated by the Aircraft Research and Development Unit RAAF
GAF Pika	Pika	Australia	Single-seat research aircraft, piloted target drone	1950–1954	Two aircraft. Manned prototypes of the proposed GAF Jindivik target drone.
Hawker P.1081	Hawker P.1081	United Kingdom	Single-seat experimental jet fighter aircraft	1950–1951	One aircraft. 75 aircraft were ordered by the RAAF in 1950, but the order was cancelled in 1951.
Hawker Typhoon	Typhoon Mk IB	United Kingdom	Single-seat fighter-bomber, ground attack aircraft	1943	Three RAF aircraft were operated by No. 451 Squadron RAAF. Used for tests and trials.
Miles Magister	M.14A Magister	United Kingdom	Two-seat trainer aircraft	1938–1940	One aircraft. Acquired for tests and trials.
Vickers Valiant	Valiant B Mk 1	United Kingdom	Four-engine long-range bomber aircraft	1956–1957	Two aircraft. Two RAF jet bombers were used at the Long Range Weapons Establishment, Woomera, South Australia.
Vickers Wellesley	Wellesley Mk I	United Kingdom	Ground-based instructional airframe	1940-?	One aircraft
Wackett Widgeon	Widgeon Mk I Widgeon Mk II	Australia	Single-engine amphibious biplane	1927–1933	Two aircraft
Wackett Warrigal	Warrigal Mk I Warrigal Mk II	Australia	Two-seat trainer biplane	1927–1933	Two built

== Civilian aircraft operating under contract ==
Aircraft type	Variant	Origin	Role	Service period	Notes
AgustaWestland AW139	AW139	Italy	Search and rescue helicopter	2018–	Six helicopter are operated by CHC Helicopters
Bell 412	412E	Canada			Three helicopters are operated by CHC Helicopters
Dassault/Dornier Alpha Jet	Alpha Jet A	Germany		2017–2019	Three aircraft were operated by Air Affairs / Top Aces
Learjet 35		United States		~2021-present	Seven Learjets modified for different purposes operated by AirAffairs Australia for RAAF training purposes.
Sikorsky S-76	S-76A Spirit	United States	Search and rescue helicopter	-2018	Six helicopter were operated by CHC Helicopters

== Defence Science and Technology Group ==
Aircraft	Variant	Origin	Role	Service period	Notes
Beechcraft 1900	Model 1900C	United States		2005-2016	One aircraft

== Hot air balloons ==
Aircraft	Variant	Origin	Role	Service period	Notes
RAAF Hot air balloon			Promotion and education	1990–	Eight hot air balloons, operated by No. 28 Squadron RAAF

== Captured enemy aircraft ==
=== World War I ===
Aircraft type	Variant	Origin	Role	Service period	Notes
AEG G.IV	G.IV	Germany	Evaluation	1918	One captured German aircraft, Shipped to Australia as a war trophy for the Australian War Museum, passed to the Brisbane City Council in 1921, eventually fell into disrepair and thought to have been scrapped at Archerfield in 1939.
Albatros C.I	C.Ib	Germany	Evaluation	1918	One captured German aircraft (Serial 4908/18). Transported to Australia for the Australian War Memorial. Offered by the Commonwealth Government to the Brisbane City Council in 1921 where it was stored while funds were sought to recondition the aircraft for display. It was passed between several organisations in the 1920s and early 1930s finding its way to Archerfield by 1932. All mention of the aircraft of the aircraft disappears from this point and it presumed that the refurbishment was abandoned and the aircraft was most likely scrapped by 1939 when the RAAF moved in to Archerfield.
Albatros D.III	D.III	Germany	Evaluation	1917	One captured German aircraft (Serial D636/17). At 7:30 am on Monday, 8 October 1917 Oberleutnant Gustav Adolf Dittmar of Flieger Abteilung 300 (Fl.Abt 300) was forced down at Goz el Basal by an aircraft from 111 Sqn, RFC. He and the aircraft were almost immediately captured Australian Soldiers of the 9th Light Horse Regiment who passed the aircraft on to 1 Squadron, Australian Flying Corps who repaired it and made if flyable again. Later on the aeroplane was dismantled and sent to London for examination. A section of wing fabric from 636/17 is held by the Aviation History Museum of Western Australia.
Albatros D.Va	D.Va	Germany	Evaluation	1917	At least three German examples captured by Australian Forces. They include D5359/17 captured by 1 Squadron, AFC at El Afule, Palestine; D5390/17 Captured by 3 Squadron, AFC on 17 December 1917 and now on display at Australian War Memorial in Canberra, ACT, Australia; and 7416/17 captured by Australian units at Jenin, Palestine.
DFW C.V	C.V	Germany	Evaluation	1917	At least two German examples captured by Australian Forces. They include 4432/17 and another example captured by the Australian Light Horse brigade and passed to 1 Squadron, AFC at El Afule, Palestine.
Fokker D.VII	D.VII	Germany	Evaluation	1918	One of seven captured Deutsche Fokker D.VII German aircraft collected in France (Serial 8371/18), Shipped to Australia as a war trophy and believed to have been flown over Melbourne in August 1920. It might have been lost in a fire in 1925, but there are also statements that the D.VII was still in storage in 1940.
Halberstadt CL.II	CL.II and CL.V	Germany	Evaluation	1918	At least three Halberstadt CL.II and one Halberstadt CL.V German aircraft were captured by Australian Forces. They include Halberstadt CL.II (serial 1534/17) flown by Gefreiter Kuesler and Vizefeldwebel Mullenbach were forced to land at the aerodrome of 3 Squadron Australian Flying Corps at Flesselles, Somme (France)on 9 June 1918 and later presented to the Australian Government as a War Trophy who in turn presented this aircraft to the Tasmanian Government; Halberstadt CL.II 8284/17; another Halberstadt CL.II captured by the Australian Light Horse at Jenin Afuleh airfield, Central Palestine; and Halberstadt CL.V 6867/18.
LVG C.II	C.II, C.V and C.VI	Germany	Evaluation	1918–1919	At least four LVG German aircraft are known to have been captured by Australian Forces. They Include two LVG C.II's. one LVG C.V and LVG C.VI 7243/18 which was forced down by Lieutenant (Lieut) V H Thornton and H N Kerr while flying Sopwith Camels of No 4 Squadron, Australian Flying Corps (AFC) near Nieppe, on 9 October 1818. 7243/18 was repaired and flown by 4 Squadron AFC and latter shipped back to Australia.
Pfalz D.III	D.IIIA	Germany	Evaluation	1918	One captured German aircraft. This aircraft was captured on 30 May 1918 when flown by VZFW Jackob Pollinger ofJasta 776 when he ran out of fuel and was forced to descend into British lines. It was allotted British serial G/SBN/13 or G/5Bde/13. It was later claimed by the Australian Government as a war trophy and came to Australia after the war.
Pfalz D.XII	D.XII	Germany	Evaluation	1918	One captured German aircraft (Serial 2600/18). This aircraft was given to Australia under terms of the Armistice that ended the First World War. The aircraft was sent from 2 Aircraft Salvage Depot in France to the UK by cross-channel steamer in late 1919, and was subsequently shipped to Australia. Its service history is unknown, but contemporary evidence suggests that the aircraft was regarded as 'used'. This indicates that the machine may have seen active use. 2600/18 was displayed in the Memorial from the 1940s until the 1960s. During this time it was mistakenly identified as a Pfalz which was forced down after combat with aircraft from 4 Squadron AFC in 1918. Currently on display at Australian War Memorial in Canberra, ACT, Australia.
Rumpler C.VII	C and C.VII	Germany	Evaluation	1918–1919	At least two German Rumpler aircraft are known to have been captured by Australian Forces. They include one Rumpler C-type Serial 993? which was one of the German aircraft apportioned to Australia under the Peace Terms. This aircraft reached Australia but its ultimate fate is unknown. The second was Rumpler C.VII (Serial 7927) Operated by 4 Squadron, AFC at Bickendorf 1919.

=== World War II ===
Aircraft type	Variant	Origin	Role	Service period	Notes
Breda Ba.25	Ba.25 Seaplane	Italy	Hack	1943	One aircraft. Captured by No. 3 Squadron RAAF at Augusta, Sicily, Italy in September 1943. Later handed over to the Free French.
Cant Z.501	Z.501 Gabbiano	Italy	Familiarisation	1943	Two aircraft. Captured by No. 3 Squadron RAAF at Augusta, Sicily, Italy in September 1943 with one being made serviceable. Both were coded CV;V. They were then handed over to the Free French on RAF Orders.
Caproni Ca.100	Ca.100	Italy	Hack	1943	Two aircraft. Five Caproni Ca.100 trainers previously used by the Catania Aero Club, Sicily, were captured at Agnone Airfield, Sicily. Three went to No. 112 Sq RAF, and one each to No. 3 and No. 450 Sqn, RAAF. They were flown at Agnone from August–September 1943 and used for taking maintenance personnel on joy rides.
Caproni Ca.309	Ca.309 Ghibli	Italy	Hack	1943	One Aircraft. Captured on 22 January 1943 at Castel Benito, Libya by 3 Squadron, RAAF and Coded CV:V. Used as a squadron hack until 4 September 1943.
Fiat CR.42 Falco	CR.42 Falco	Italy	Familiarisation	1941 & 1943	One captured on 24 January 1941 by 3 Squadron, RAAF at Martuba (given serial A421) and another captured by 450 Squadron, RAAF at Castel Benito Airfield, Tripoli, Libya, January, 1943 and coded OK:FS.
Henschel Hs 126	Henschel Hs.126B-1	Germany	Hack/Reconnaissance	1942	One captured on 12 November 1942 by 450 Squadron, RAAF near Tobruk from 2.(H)/Aufklärungsgruppe 14 and coded OK. Operated as unit hack, for joy flights and even some local reconnaissance.
Junkers Ju 52	Junkers Ju.52/3M	Germany	Transport	1943	One operated by 450 Squadron, RAAF. This Luftwaffe's transport aircraft Junkers Ju 52/3m was captured intact by the Australian forces at Ain-El Gazala, Libya, repainted with the Royal Australian Air Force's roundels and nicknamed "Libyan Clipper". The aircraft was used by 450 Squadron RAAF to transport mail, food supplies and small items from Cairo and back to the front line, doing two or three trips each week. Lord Casey, Governor General of Australia, came in this aircraft to see the men of the squadron. 1943.
Macchi MC.205	MC.205V Veltro	Italy	Familiarisation	1943	This aircraft was captured by the Australians, at the Pachion Airfield in Sicily, Italy in the summer of 1943.
Messerschmitt Bf 109	Bf 109 E, Bf 109 F, BF 109 F-4, Bf 109 G-6/Trop, Bf 109 G-6/U2	Germany	Familiarisation	1940–1946	At least five examples are known to have been captured. Bf 109 E Wn0750 Shipped to Australia and exhibited on War Bond tours. Bf 109F & Bf 109F-4 Captured by 3 Squadron RAAF (one went on to become HK849 with the RAF). Bf 109 G/Trop (10693) "Black 6" Also captured by 3 Squadron, RAAF before being passed to the RAF to become RN228, restored to flight as G-USTV and now on display at the RAF Museum, Cosford. Bf 109 G-6/U2 (163824) is on display at the Australian War Memorial, Canberra. It is the last example to retain its original wartime camouflage and markings.
Messerschmitt Me 163	Me 163B Komet	Germany	War Prize	1945	One captured Luftwaffe aircraft, shipped to Australia from the United Kingdom immediately after the Second World War, on display at the Australian War Memorial in Canberra, ACT, Australia. Me 163B, Werknummer 191907, this aircraft was also part of JG 400 and captured at Husum.
Messerschmitt Me 262	Me 262-2a Schwalbe	Germany	War Prize	1945	One captured Luftwaffe aircraft, Me 262 A-2a W.Nr.500200 "Black X 9K+XK", 2 Staffel./KG 51, shipped to Australia from the United Kingdom immediately after the Second World War, on display at the Australian War Memorial in Canberra, ACT, Australia.
Mitsubishi A6M Zero	A6M2 & A6M5	Japan	Evaluation	1942–1945	Several examples captured including A6M5 5622 which was operated by 79 Squadron.
Mitsubishi Ki-21	Ki-21 IIa	Japan	Surrender Aircraft	1945	One aircraft surrendered to the Allies in October 1945 at Moratai carrying Lieutenant-General Ichi (Supreme Commander of the Japanese forces in the Celebes), transferred to the RAAF and then the Australian War Memorial before being scrapped in the 1960s.
Mitsubishi Ki-51	Ki-51	Japan	Hack	1944–1945	Several examples captured including one which was captured at Kenigau made airworthy by 4 Squadron, RAAF and flown and operated on Labuan Island coded QE-?
Tachikawa Ki-54	Ki-54c	Japan	Surrender Aircraft	1945	One aircraft. Operated by the 10th Dokuritsu Hikodan Shireibu and flown into Labuan Island on 10 September 1945 for a Surrender Ceremony at the Headquarters of 9th Division, Australian Army by Lieutenant General Masao Baba to Major General Sir George Frederick Wootten. Lieutenant General Baba was Supreme Commander of Japanese Forces in Borneo and commanded the 37th Japanese Army. The aircraft was shipped form Borneo to RAAF Base Laverton, Australia and its fuselage is in the collection of the Australian War Memorial.

== Drones/RAV ==
Aircraft type	Variant	Origin	Role	Service period	Notes
A92 GAF Jindivik	Jindivik Mk I Jindivik Mk 2 Jindivik Mk 2B; Jindivik Mk 102; Jindivik Mk 3 Jindivik Mk 3A	Australia	Radio controlled pilotless target drone	1952–1986, 1997	Name is from an Aboriginal Australian word meaning the hunted one
A45 IAI Heron		Israel	ISR MALE UAV	2010–2017	Five machines. Operated by No. 5 Flight RAAF
MQ-4C Triton		United States	ISR MALE UAV	2024-present	3-5 aircraft

== List of weapons of the Royal Australian Air Force ==
=== Guided Missiles ===
Model	Variants	Origin	Role	Service period	Notes
AGM-65 Maverick		United States	Air-to-surface guided missile		Obsolete, no longer in service with the RAAF. Carried by the F/A-18 Hornet.
AGM-84 Harpoon	AGM-84A	United States	Air-to-surface anti-ship missile	1981-Current	Carried by the F/A-18 Hornet, F/A-18F Super Hornet, F-111C and F-111G Aardvark, P-3C and AP-3C Orion, and P-8A Poseidon. Being phased out in favor of the AGM-158C LRASM on the Super Hornet.
AGM-88 HARM	AGM-88E; AGM-88G	United States	Air-to-surface anti-radiation missile	Current	Carried by the EA-18G Growler and F/A-18F Super Hornet. Future use (AGM-88G) on F-35A Lightning II.
AGM-142 Popeye	AGM-142	Israel	Air-to-surface missile	??-2010	Carried by the F-111C and F-111G Aardvark.
AGM-154 Joint Standoff Weapon	AGM-154C	United States	Glide bomb	Current	Carried by the F/A-18F Super Hornet, EA-18G Growler and F-35A Lightning II.
AGM-158 JASSM		United States	Air-to-surface cruise missile	Current	Carried by the F/A-18 Hornet and F/A-18F Super Hornet. Potential future use on F-35A Lightning II.
AGM-158C LRASM		United States	Anti-ship cruise missile	2024-Current	Carried by the F/A-18F Super Hornet. Replacing AGM-84. Potential future use on F-35A Lightning II.
AIM-7 Sparrow	AIM-7M	United States	Medium-range air-to-air missile	1985–2002	Obsolete, no longer in service with the RAAF. Carried by the F/A-18 Hornet.
AIM-9 Sidewinder	AIM-9B (retired); AIM-9L/M (for use on Hawk 127 only); AIM-9X	United States	Short-range air-to-air missile	1960-Current	Carried by the CAC CA-26 Sabre, Mirage IIIO, F/A-18 Hornet, F/A-18F Super Hornet, F-35A Lightning II, Hawk 127, F-111C and F-111G Aardvark.
AIM-120 AMRAAM		United States	Medium-range air-to-air missile	2002-Current	Carried by the F/A-18 Hornet, F/A-18F Super Hornet and F-35A Lightning II.
ASRAAM		United Kingdom	Short-range air-to-air missile	2004–2021	Obsolete, no longer in service with the RAAF. Carried by the F/A-18 Hornet.
Bloodhound		United Kingdom	Surface-to-air missile	1963–1968	Obsolete, no longer in service with the RAAF. The Bloodhound missiles were operated by No. 30 Squadron RAAF.
GBU-10 Paveway II		United States	Air-to-surface laser-guided bomb	Current	Carried by the F/A-18 Hornet, F/A-18F Super Hornet, F-111C and F-111G Aardvark.
GBU-12 Paveway II		United States	Air-to-surface laser-guided bomb	1982-Current	Carried by the Mirage IIIO, F/A-18 Hornet, F/A-18F Super Hornet, F-111C and F-111G Aardvark.
GBU-15		United States	Precision guided munition	1984-2010	Obsolete, no longer in service with the RAAF. Carried by the F-111C and F-111G Aardvark.
GBU-16		United States	Air-to-surface laser-guided bomb		Carried by the F/A-18 Hornet and F/A-18F Super Hornet.
Joint Direct Attack Munition		United States	Bomb guidance kit	Current	Carried by F/A-18F Super Hornet, F-35A Lightning II, Hawk 127 and P-8A Poseidon.
Mark 46 torpedo		United States	Lightweight anti-submarine torpedo	??-2023	Carried by the P-3B, P-3C and AP-3C Orion.
Mark 54 torpedo		United States	Lightweight anti-submarine torpedo	Current	Carried by the P-8A Poseidon.
MU90 Impact		France / Italy	Lightweight anti-submarine torpedo	??-2023	No longer in service with the RAAF. Carried by the AP-3C Orion.
R.530		France	Short-to-medium range air-to-air missile	1965-1980s	Obsolete, no longer in service with the RAAF. Carried by the Mirage IIIO.
R.550 Magic		France	Short-range air-to-air missile	1983–1988	Obsolete, no longer in service with the RAAF. Carried by the Mirage IIIO.

=== Unguided rockets ===
Model	Origin	Role	Service Period	Notes
Folding-Fin Aerial Rocket	United States	70-mm (2.75-inch) air-to-surface rockets	1960s-	Carried by the UH-1 Iroquois helicopter. Used by the RAAF during the Vietnam War.
Hydra 70 Rocket	United States	70-mm (2.75-inch) air-to-surface rockets		
RP-3 Rocket Projectile	United Kingdom	3-inch air-to-ground rocket projectiles	1940s-1970s	

=== Free fall bombs ===
Model	Origin	Role
Mark 82 bomb	United States	500-lb (230-kg) low drag general-purpose bomb
Mark 83 bomb	United States	1000-lb (454-kg) low drag general-purpose bomb
Mark 84 bomb	United States	2000-lb (907-kg) low-drag general-purpose bomb

=== Machine-guns ===
Model	Origin	Role	Notes
7.62-mm (0.308-inch) M60 machine gun	United States	General purpose machine gun	Carried by the UH-1 Iroquois helicopters.
7.62-mm (0.308-inch) M134 Minigun	United States	Six-barrel rotary machine gun	Carried by the UH-1 Iroquois helicopter.

== See also ==
- List of current Royal Australian Air Force aircraft
- List of General Dynamics F-111 aircraft operated by the Royal Australian Air Force
- List of Australian Army aircraft

== Bibliography ==
- Morgan, Eric B. & Burnet, Charles (December 1981 – March 1982). "Walrus... Amphibious Angel of Mercy". Air Enthusiast (17): 13–25. ISSN 0143-5450.
