= List of General Dynamics F-111 aircraft operated by the Royal Australian Air Force =

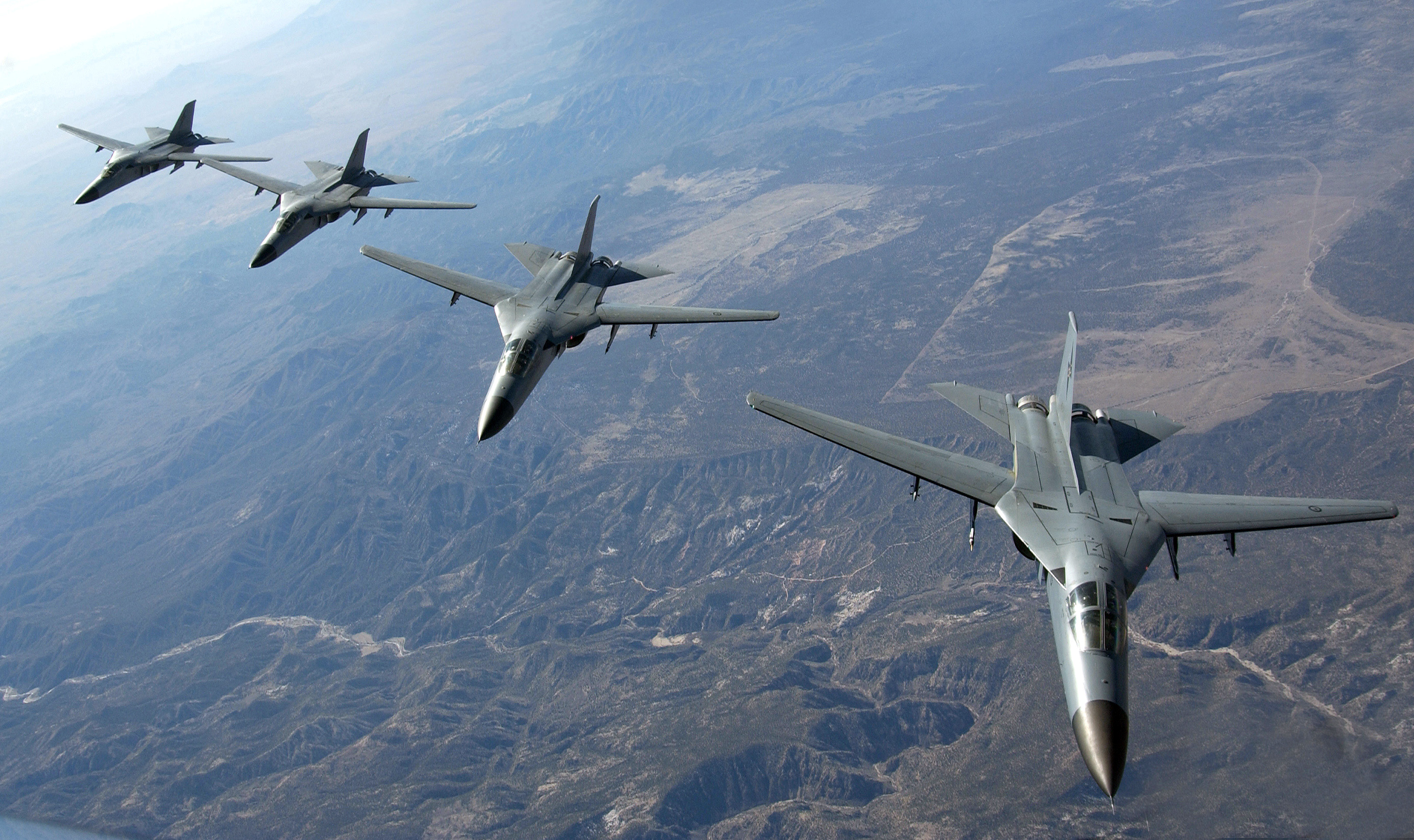
Four Australian F-111Cs in 2006

This is a list of the General Dynamics F-111 aircraft operated by the Royal Australian Air Force (RAAF) between 1973 and 2010. The RAAF's fleet of F-111s included 28 F-111Cs (of which four were converted to RF-111C reconnaissance aircraft) and 15 F-111Gs. Several more F-111s were purchased from the United States and used for ground training and testing purposes, or as a source of spare parts.

== Background ==
The Australian Government purchased 24 F-111Cs in 1963. These were completed during 1968 and early 1969, and the first of the RAAF's aircraft was handed over to the service on 4 September 1968. However, the entire fleet was grounded in the United States shortly afterwards while serious deficiencies with the F-111's design were corrected. The RAAF finally accepted the 24 aircraft during 1973, and they flew to Australia in four groups between 1 June and 4 December that year.

Four of the F-111Cs were modified to RF-111C reconnaissance aircraft. The first, A8-126, received these modifications in the United States between October 1979 and April 1979; the other three were converted in Australia between July and September 1980.

The RAAF purchased four ex-United States Air Force (USAF) F-111As in 1981 as attrition replacements. These aircraft were delivered to the service in 1982 and were subsequently converted to F-111C standard.

In 1992 the Australian Government decided to purchase up to 18 ex-USAF F-111Gs in order to extend the type's service life. 15 F-111Gs were eventually acquired, and they were delivered to the RAAF during late 1993 and early 1994. Three more ex-USAF F-111Gs were also held for Australia in the United States, but never delivered. Other ex-USAF F-111s were also held at the 309th Aerospace Maintenance and Regeneration Group (AKA The Boneyard) in Arizona as sources of spare parts for the RAAFs fleet of aircraft.

The Australian Government announced on 7 November 2003 that the RAAF's F-111s would be retired from 2010, and on 16 March 2007 it was announced that the type would be withdrawn by the end of 2010. The F-111Gs were retired before the F-111Cs, with the last leaving service on 3 September 2007. The F-111C fleet was drawn down, and the type was finally retired on 3 December 2010. Eight of the RAAF's F-111s (seven F-111Cs and one F-111G) were destroyed in crashes during the type's service, with ten airmen being killed.

Following the F-111s' retirement, 13 of the surviving aircraft (12 F-111Cs and a single F-111G) were preserved in aviation museums and RAAF air bases. The remaining aircraft were buried at the Swanbank landfill site outside of Ipswich, Queensland, between 21 and 23 November 2011.

== Aircraft ==
Variant	RAAF serial number	Delivery/acceptance	Fate	Comments	Image
F-111A	N/A	January 1995	Buried 22 November 2011	Ex-USAF aircraft used as a training aid. USAF serial 63-9768	
F-111A	N/A	November 1999	Tested to destruction by the DSTO, with the teardown of the airframe being completed in late 2003	Purchased for airframe testing purposes USAF serial 67-0106	
F-111A	N/A	N/A	?	Stored at the 309th Aerospace Maintenance and Regeneration Group in the US for possible RAAF use from 1981; USAF serial 67-0108	
F-111A/C	A8-109	13 August 1982	Preserved at the Historical Aircraft Restoration Society	Final F-111 to shut down its engines.	A8-109 in 2020
F-111A/C	A8-112	13 August 1982	Buried 23 November 2011; Fin and rudder preserved at RAAF Base Amberley		
F-111A/C	A8-113	1982	Preserved at the Australian Aviation Heritage Centre		A8-113 at an air show in 2005
F-111A/C	A8-114	1982	Buried 24 November 2011; Fin and rudder preserved at RAAF Base Amberley		
F-111C	A8-125	16 March 1973	Preserved at the RAAF Museum	First F-111C to arrive in Australia, and final aircraft to land at the type's retirement ceremony	A8-125 in 2014
F-111C/RF-111C	A8-126	6 September 1968 & 6 April 1973	Preserved at the RAAF Amberly Aviation Heritage Centre	Accepted in 1968, but grounded while major structural problems with the F-111s were resolved. Accepted for a second time in 1973. Prototype RF-111C, converted to this variant between October 1978 and April 1979	A8-126 performing the final F-111C "dump and burn" at an airshow in September 2010
F-111C	A8-127	6 April 1973	Destroyed in a crash at Guyra, New South Wales on 13 September 1993; Both aircrew killed		A8-127 in July 1993
F-111C	A8-128	30 April 1973	Destroyed in a crash at Tenterfield, New South Wales on 2 April 1987; Both aircrew killed		
F-111C	A8-129	18 April 1973	Preserved at the Queensland Air Museum		A-129 outside the Queensland Air Museum in 2013
F-111C	A8-130	27 April 1973	Preserved at the Pacific Aviation Museum Pearl Harbor		A-130 outside of the Pacific Aviation Museum Pearl Harbor in 2013
F-111C	A8-131	? 1973	Buried 23 November 2011; Crew escape module preserved at the Australian National Aviation Museum		A8-131 in flight during 2006
F-111C	A8-132	8 May 1973	Preserved at the South Australian Aviation Museum		A8-132 on display at the South Australian Aviation Museum in 2025
F-111C	A8-133	27 July 1973	Destroyed in a crash at Evans Head, New South Wales on 29 September 1977; Both aircrew killed		
F-111C/RF-111C	A8-134	8 June 1973	Preserved at the Australian War Memorial	Converted to RF-111C during 1980	A8-134 in 2009
F-111C	A8-135	29 June 1973	Buried 23 November 2011; Crew escape module preserved at the Caboolture Warplane Museum		A8-135's crew escape module on display in 2013
F-111C	A8-136	27 July 1973	Destroyed in a crash at Armidale, New South Wales on 28 April 1977; Both aircrew survived		
F-111C	A8-137	? 1973	Destroyed in a crash at RNZAF Base Ohakea on 24 August 1979; Both aircrew survived	Crew escape module, rudder and fin preserved at the Amberley Aviation Heritage Centre	
F-111C	A8-138	26 July 1973	Gate guardian at RAAF Base Amberley		A8-138 in 2010
F-111C	A8-139	? 1973	Crashed into the sea and destroyed off Moruya, New South Wales on 28 January 1986; Both aircrew killed		
F-111C	A8-140	3 August 1973	Buried 24 November 2011; Crew escape module preserved at the Aviation Heritage Museum, Fin and rudder preserved at RAAF Base Amberley		A8-140's crew escape capsule in 2025
F-111C	A8-141	? 1973	Crashed into Auckland Harbour and destroyed on 25 October 1978. Both aircrew survived	Crew escape module preserved at RAAF Base Amberley	A8-141's crew escape capsule in 2007
F-111C	A8-142	22 August 1973	Preserved at RAAF Base Wagga		A8-142 in June 1990
F-111C/RF-111C	A8-143	6 September 1973	Buried 24 November 2011; Fin and rudder preserved at RAAF Base Amberley	Modified to RF-111C standard in 1980; Suffered damage in a belly landing at Amberley on 18 July 2006 and never repaired	The nose of A8-143 in 1986
F-111C	A8-144	18 September 1973	Buried 23 November 2011	Carried special "city of Ipswitch" scheme on tail and forward section	A8-144 in March 2009
F-111C	A8-145	27 September 1973	Buried 23 November 2011	Repair of Fatigue crack in lower wing during 1996. The fatigue crack was a chordwise 48 mm crack in the critical, non-failsafe, port lower wing skin at approximately 2/3 semi span. The crack had reduced the wing's residual strength to below Design Limit Load and the repair was therefore critical.	
F-111C/RF-111C	A8-146	? 1973	Buried 24 November 2011; Reconnaissance pallet donated to the Australian War Memorial, fin and rudder preserved at RAAF Base Amberley	Modified to RF-111C standard in 1980	A8-146 in 1986
F-111C	A8-147	26 October 1973	Preserved at the Evans Head Memorial Aerodrome		A8-147 in 1975
F-111C	A8-148	4 December 1973	Preserved at Fighter World, RAAF Base Williamtown		A8-148 in 2008
F-111G	A8-259	?	Buried 22 November 2011		
F-111G	A8-264	?	Buried 23 November 2011		
F-111G	A8-265	?	Buried 21 November 2011		
F-111G	A8-270	?	Buried 22 November 2011		
F-111G	A8-271	?	Buried 23 November 2011		
F-111G	A8-272	?	Preserved at the RAAF Museum	Nicknamed "The Boneyard Wrangler", as it was revived from a USAF graveyard salvaging parts from various other F-111s. Only Complete F-111G in Australia to be preserved	A8-272 in 2005
F-111G	A8-274	?	Buried 23 November 2011		A8-274 in 2008
F-111G	A8-277	?	Buried 21 November 2011		
F-111G	A8-278	?	Buried 22 November 2011		
F-111G	A8-281	?	Buried 22 November 2011		
F-111G	A8-282	?	Buried 23 November 2011		
F-111G	A8-291	?	Destroyed in a crash on Pulau Aur, Malaysia on 18 April 1999; Both aircrew killed		
F-111G	A8-506	?	Buried 22 November 2011		
F-111G	A8-512	?	Buried 23 November 2011; Fin and rudder preserved at RAAF Base Amberley. Fin on display at entrance to HQJOC.		
F-111G	A8-514	?	Buried 22 November 2011		
FB-111A	N/A	?	On display at the Fleet Air Arm Museum since November 2014	The forward section only of the ex-USAF FB-111A 68-0246 was acquired by the RAAF as a recruitment aid	The forward section of FB-111A 68-0246 in 2015

== See also ==
- List of aircraft of the Royal Australian Air Force
