= List of current Royal Australian Air Force aircraft =

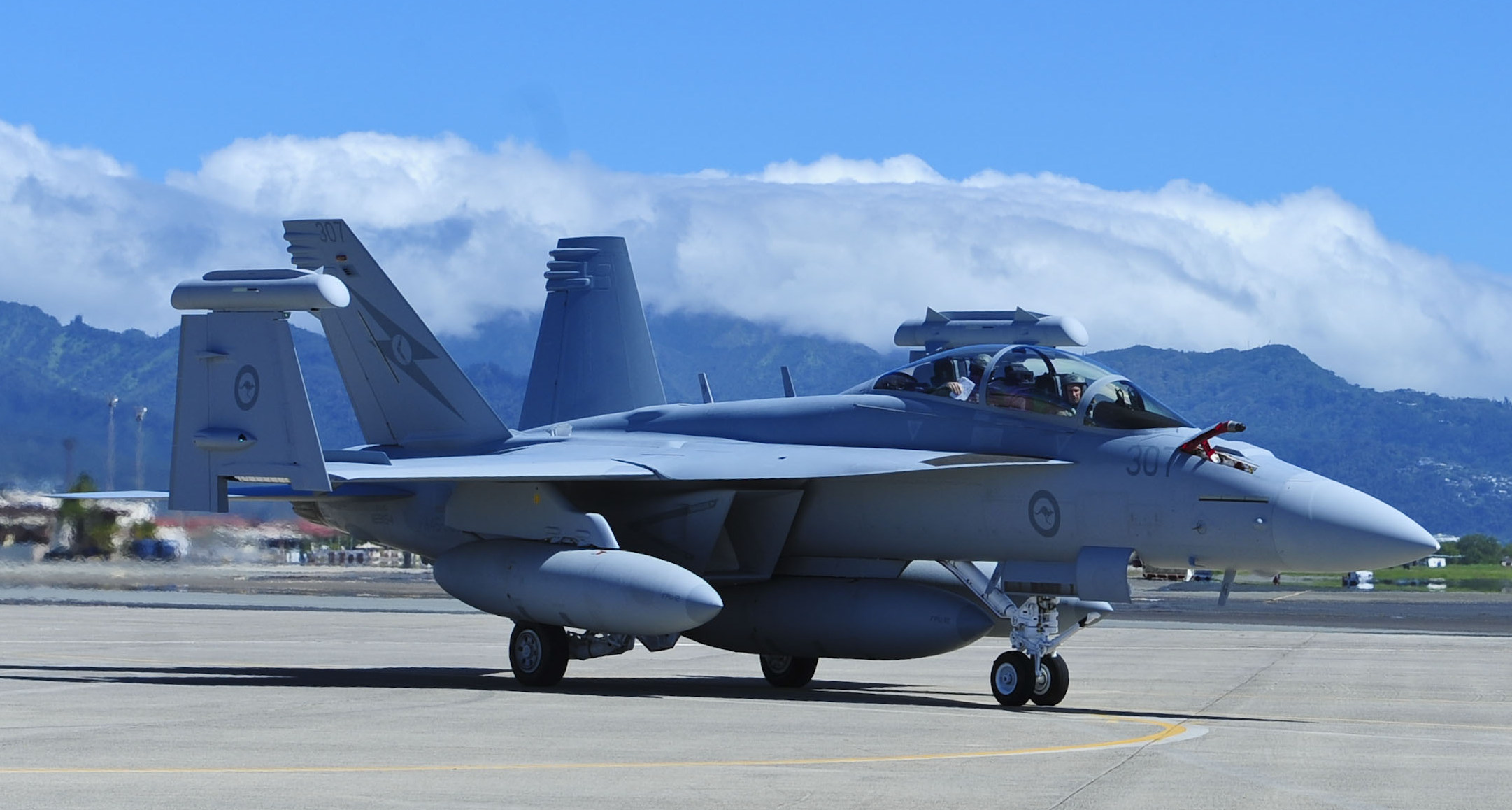
An Australian EA-18G in 2017

This is a list of the current Royal Australian Air Force aircraft in operation:

== Current aircraft ==
Aircraft	Unit operating	Number of aircraft	Origin
Combat aircraft
Lockheed Martin F-35A Lightning II stealth multirole fighter aircraft	No. 2 Operational Conversion Unit (RAAF Base Williamtown) No. 3 Squadron (RAAF Base Williamtown) No. 77 Squadron (RAAF Base Williamtown) No. 75 Squadron (RAAF Base Tindal)	72	United States
Boeing F/A-18F Super Hornet strike fighter aircraft	No. 1 Squadron (RAAF Base Amberley)	24	United States
Patrol aircraft
Boeing P-8A Poseidon maritime patrol and anti submarine warfare aircraft	No. 11 Squadron (RAAF Base Edinburgh) No. 12 Squadron (RAAF Base Edinburgh)	14	United States
AEW&C and EW aircraft
Boeing E-7A Wedgetail Airborne Early Warning & Control aircraft	No. 2 Squadron (RAAF Base Williamtown)	6	Australia
Boeing EA-18G Growler Electronic Warfare aircraft	No. 6 Squadron (RAAF Base Amberley)	12	United States
MC-55A Peregrine Intelligence, Surveillance, Reconnaissance and Electronic Warfare (ISREW) aircraft	No. 10 Squadron (RAAF Base Edinburgh)	4	United States
Transport aircraft
Alenia C-27J Spartan battlefield airlifter	No. 35 Squadron (RAAF Base Amberley)	10	Italy
Lockheed C-130J Hercules medium transport	No. 37 Squadron (RAAF Base Richmond)	12 (20 on order to replace and expand current fleet)	United States
Boeing C-17 Globemaster heavy transport	No. 36 Squadron (RAAF Base Amberley)	8	United States
Airbus KC-30A Multi-Role Tanker Transport	No. 33 Squadron (RAAF Base Amberley)	7 (1 VIP configured)	Spain/France
Boeing BBJ (Boeing Business Jet) VIP transport	No. 34 Squadron (Defence Establishment Fairbairn)	2	United States
Dassault Falcon 7X VIP transport	No. 34 Squadron (Defence Establishment Fairbairn)	3	France
Beechcraft King Air 350 light transport	No. 32 Squadron (RAAF Base East Sale)	12	United States
Helicopters
AgustaWestland AW139 SAR helicopter	RAAF Base Amberley RAAF Base East Sale RAAF Base Pearce RAAF Base Tindal RAAF Base Williamtown	6 (contracted with CHC Helicopter)	Italy
Training aircraft
Diamond DA40NG	Australian Air Force Cadets	8 (under civilian registrations)	Austria
Pilatus PC-21	Central Flying School (RAAF Base East Sale) No. 1 Flying Training School (RAAF Base East Sale) No. 2 Flying Training School (RAAF Base Pearce) No. 4 Squadron (FAC training) (RAAF Base Williamtown)	49	Switzerland
BAe Hawk 127 lead-in fighter trainer	No. 79 Squadron (RAAF Base Pearce); No. 76 Squadron (RAAF Base Williamtown)	33	United Kingdom
Beechcraft King Air 350 navigation & specialised trainer	No. 32 Squadron (RAAF Base East Sale)	4 (Of the 12 total)	United States
Remotely piloted aircraft
MQ-4C Triton	No. 9 Squadron (RAAF Base Edinburgh)	2 (2 on order)	United States
MQ-28 Ghost Bat	TBD	10 on order	Australia

== Heritage aircraft ==
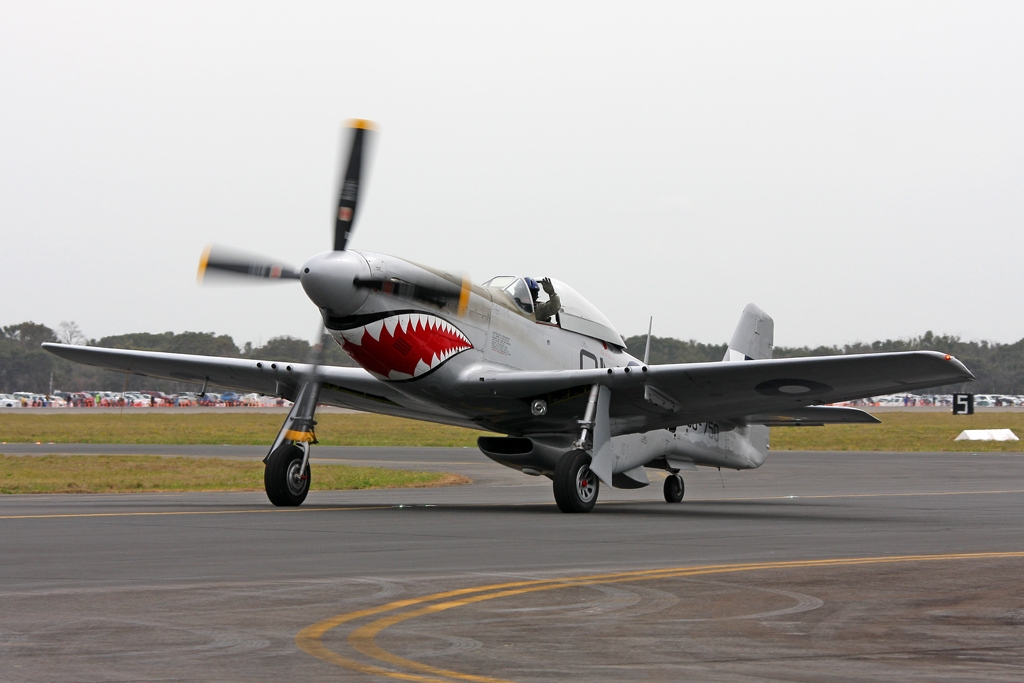
CAC CA-18 Mustang A68-170 of the No. 100 SQN - Air Force Heritage Squadron

No. 100 Squadron was reformed in March 2021 as the Air Force Heritage Squadron to operate airworthy warbirds inherited from the RAAF Museum and Temora Aviation Museum. The unit is based at the RAAF Point Cook with separate flights at Point Cook and Temora. The ownership of 12 historic aircraft was transferred from Temora Aviation Museum to the RAAF in July 2019; they continue to be maintained by museum staff but operated by the RAAF as part of No. 100 Squadron Temora Flight with pilots inducted into the RAAF Reserve.

== Future acquisitions ==
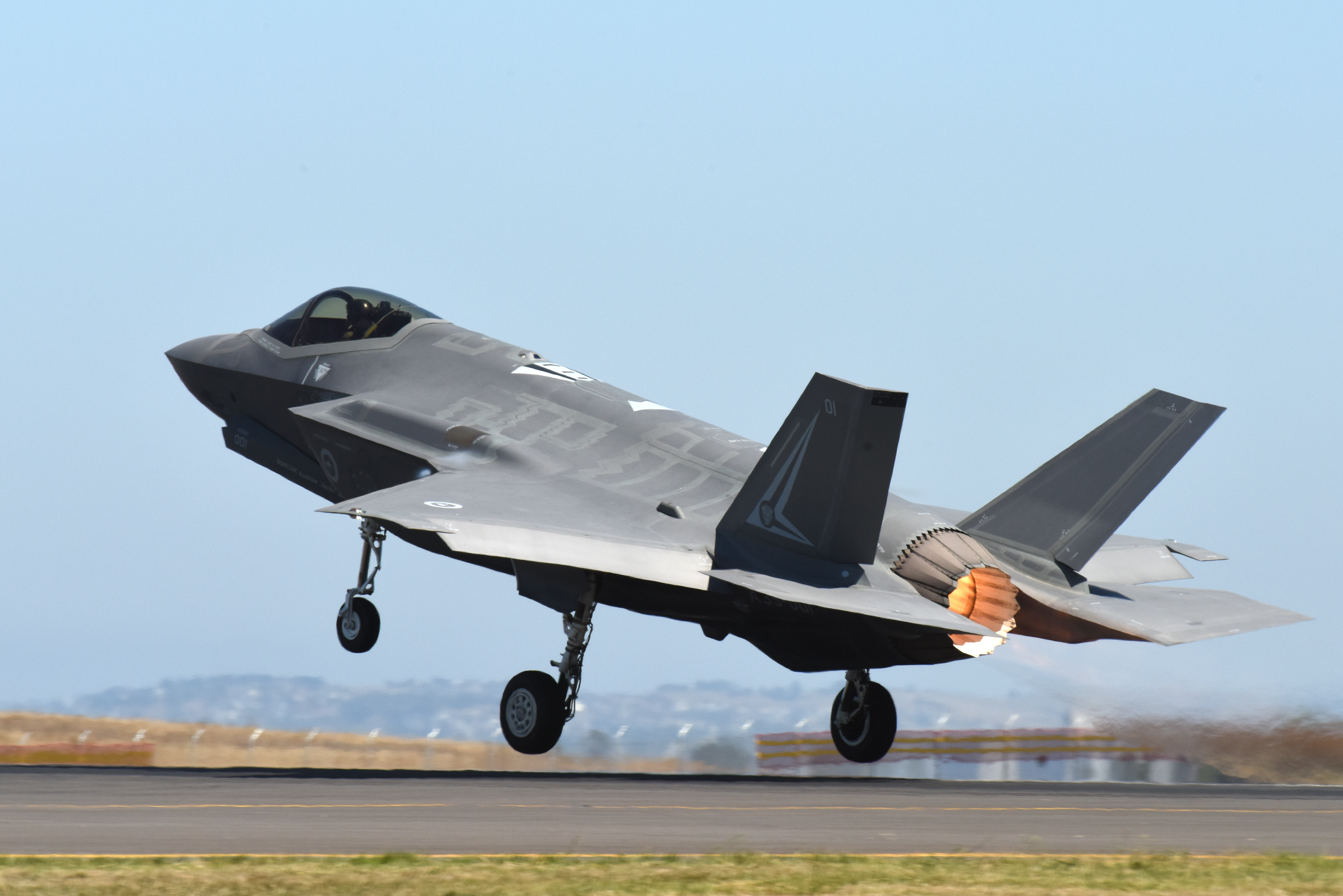
A F-35 taking off during the Australian International Airshow

- AIR 6000: Lockheed Martin F-35 Lightning II multirole fighter
  - A possible total of 100 F-35As are to be purchased under Project Air 6000 to replace the Hornets and Super Hornets.
    - AIR 6000, Phase 2A/2B, Stage 1: 14 F-35A fighters have been approved for purchase for service entry from 2014.
    - AIR 6000, Phase 2A/2B, Stage 2: 58 F-35A fighters have been approved for purchase bringing total on order to 72 aircraft. Stage 1&2 will replace all F/A-18A/B fighters in service.
    - AIR 6000, Phase 2C: around 28 additional F-35A fighters planned for purchase. These will replace all F/A-18F fighters in service.
- AIR 7000: ADF Maritime ISR capability replacement
  - Programme to replace the AP-3C Orion maritime patrol aircraft with a crewed MPA/UAV mix.
    - AIR 7000, Phase 1B: Purchase of 7 high altitude, long endurance maritime surveillance UAV. The MQ-4C Global Hawk was originally selected for the role, but the decision has been delayed until after the crewed portion is introduced.
    - AIR 7000, Phase 2B: Purchase of 8 Boeing P-8A Poseidon crewed MPA has been given first-pass approval for service entry from 2018.
- AIR 5428: Pilot Training System
  - Programme to replace PC-9/A training aircraft and training syllabus.
    - Air 5428, Phase 1: 49 Pilatus PC-21 ordered in 2015 for entry into service by 2019.
- Project AIR 555: Gulfstream G550
  - In late 2015 the RAAF ordered two Gulfstream G550 aircraft to be delivered by 30 November 2017. The aircraft will be used for signals and electronic intelligence gathering. Both Australian Aviation and FlightGlobal have reported that the aircraft will possibly form the replacement for the electronic intelligence-gathering role performed by 2 of RAAF's AP-3 Orions.
  - In March 2019, Defence Minister Christopher Pyne claimed that Australia will acquire four modified Gulfstream G550 business jets to strengthen the country's electronic warfare capabilities. The $2.46 billion acquisition of the 4 G550s will be designated as the MC-55A Peregrine variant. It will be operated by the RAAF's Surveillance and Reconnaissance Group (SRG).

== See also ==
- List of aircraft of the Royal Australian Air Force
- Boeing C-17 Globemaster III in Australian service
- Lockheed C-130 Hercules in Australian service
