= VIP aircraft affair =

The VIP aircraft affair was an Australian political controversy relating to the use of Royal Australian Air Force (RAAF) VIP aircraft by the Holt government and its predecessor the Menzies government. It occurred in the lead-up to the 1967 Senate election.

In an attempt to avoid negative media coverage, Prime Minister Harold Holt provided vague and inaccurate answers to parliamentary questions about the VIP fleet, notably denying the existence of passenger manifests which might confirm instances of misuse. Air Minister Peter Howson became aware of the inaccuracies and sought to protect Holt, but their statements were soon subjected to further scrutiny, leading to accusations that they had conspired to mislead parliament. The situation came to a head in October 1967, when the opposition moved to call senior public servants before the Senate, but was defused somewhat by the decision on the 25th of October of John Gorton, the Leader of the Government in the Senate, to table the "missing" passenger manifests.

The controversy weakened Holt's popularity and diminished the reputations of Holt and Howson within the Liberal Party. However, its significance was lessened by the drowning death of Holt in December 1967. Gorton's decisive action, although initially harmful to the government, boosted his standing among government senators and may have contributed to his election as Holt's successor.
