= No. 1 Air Ambulance Unit RAAF =

Royal Australian Air Force air ambulance unit

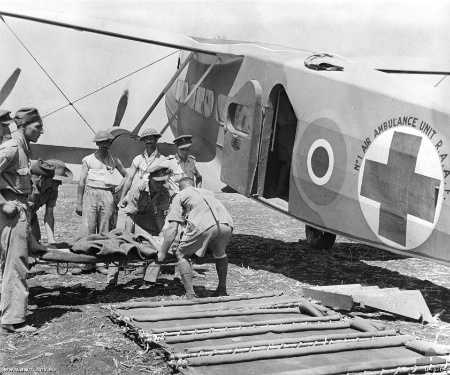
A patient being loaded on a No. 1 Air Ambulance Unit aircraft in Scily in September 1943

No. 1 Air Ambulance Unit was a Royal Australian Air Force air ambulance unit of World War II. The unit was formed in February 1941 and was disbanded in June 1944 after seeing action in the Mediterranean Theatre of World War II.

== History ==
No. 1 Air Ambulance Unit was formed on 15 February 1941 at RAAF Base Laverton and was equipped with three de Havilland DH-86 aircraft. The Unit left Australia for the Middle East in April 1941 and began flying from Gaza in August 1941. The unit supported Commonwealth units during the North African Campaign and Tunisia campaign from December 1941 until the end of the Tunisia campaign in May 1943. No. 1 Air Ambulance Unit was expanded and reequipped with 11 Bristol Bombay aircraft in February 1943. From July 1943 the unit supported the Allied invasion of Sicily and deployed to Italy in September 1943 to participate in the Italian Campaign.

Due to the availability of larger and faster medical evacuation aircraft operated by the Royal Air Force and United States Army Air Forces and the Bombays' mechanical problems No. 1 Air Ambulance Unit was withdrawn from service and flew its last evacuation mission in November 1943. The unit embarked for Australia in late February 1944 and was disbanded in Australia on 27 June 1944.
