= Royal Australian Air Force VIP aircraft =

RAAF aircraft fleet used for government and VIP transport

RAAF BBJ 737 MAX 8 in 2026.

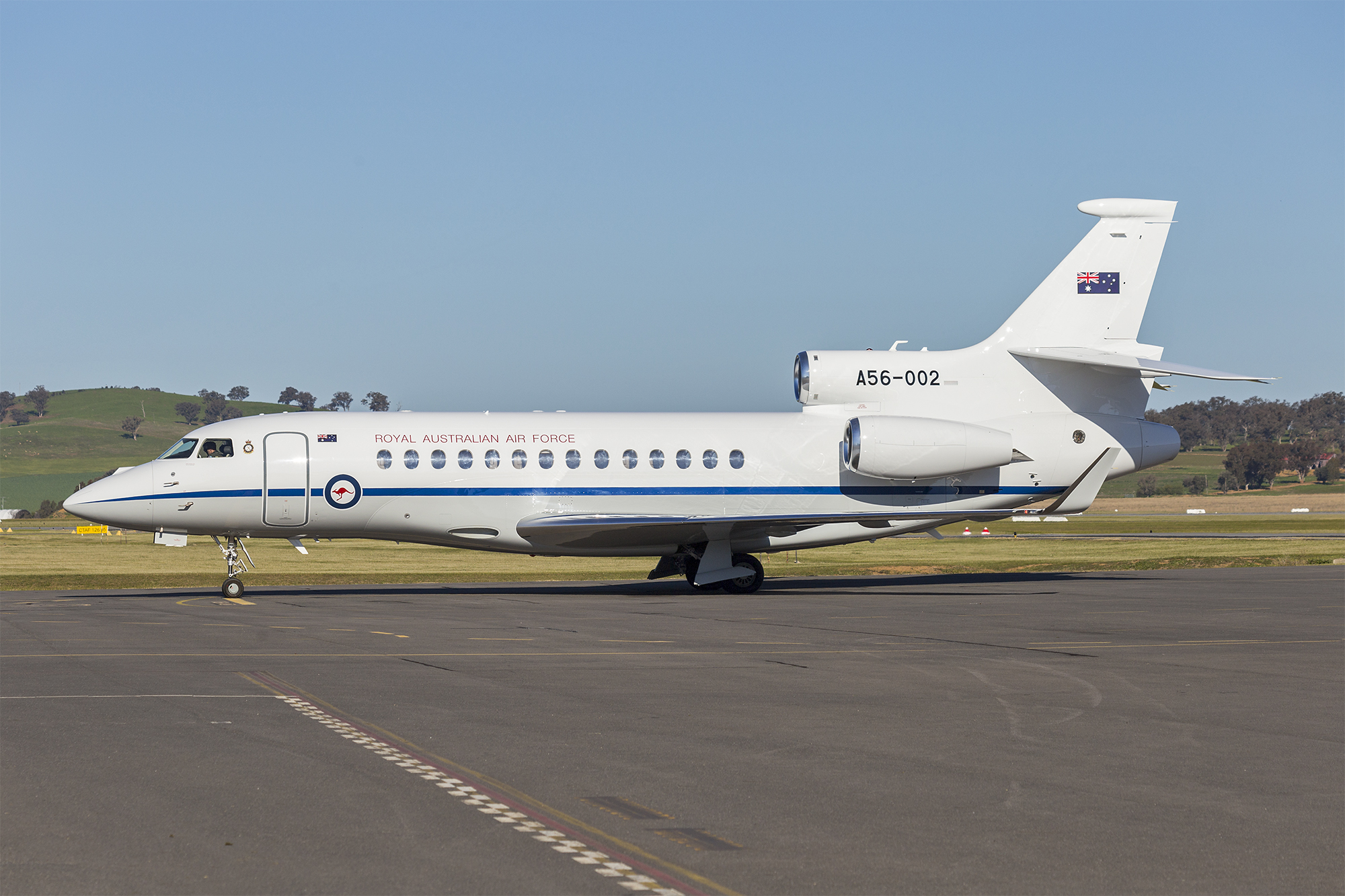
RAAF Dassault Falcon 7X

The Royal Australian Air Force (RAAF) operates a number of specialised aircraft to transport the governor-general of Australia, the prime minister of Australia, senior members of the Australian Government and visiting dignitaries including the monarch of Australia, members of the royal family and foreign heads of state.

The RAAF's current Special Purpose Aircraft consist of two Boeing Business Jets and three Dassault Falcon 7X aircraft, which are operated by No. 34 Squadron RAAF and are based out of Canberra Airport. The Boeing Business Jets are custom-configured Boeing 737 MAX 8s fitted with facilities such as conference tables, office suites, and secure satellite communication capabilities. The two aircraft have a longer range than is standard for Boeing Business Jets. The prime minister regularly makes use of these aircraft for both domestic and international travel.

Prior to the acquisition of Boeing 737s, passenger-configured RAAF Boeing 707 tanker-transports were used. These aircraft were larger than the 737s currently in use.

In August 2014, then-defence minister David Johnston announced his intention to convert an Airbus KC-30A multi-role tanker to VIP configuration while maintaining its ability to serve as a military tanker and transport aircraft. It has the tail number A39-007. The plane is painted "air force grey" rather than the usual VIP colour scheme, and can carry more than 100 passengers, including government officials and members of the press on lie-flat seats. The prime minister also has a private section.

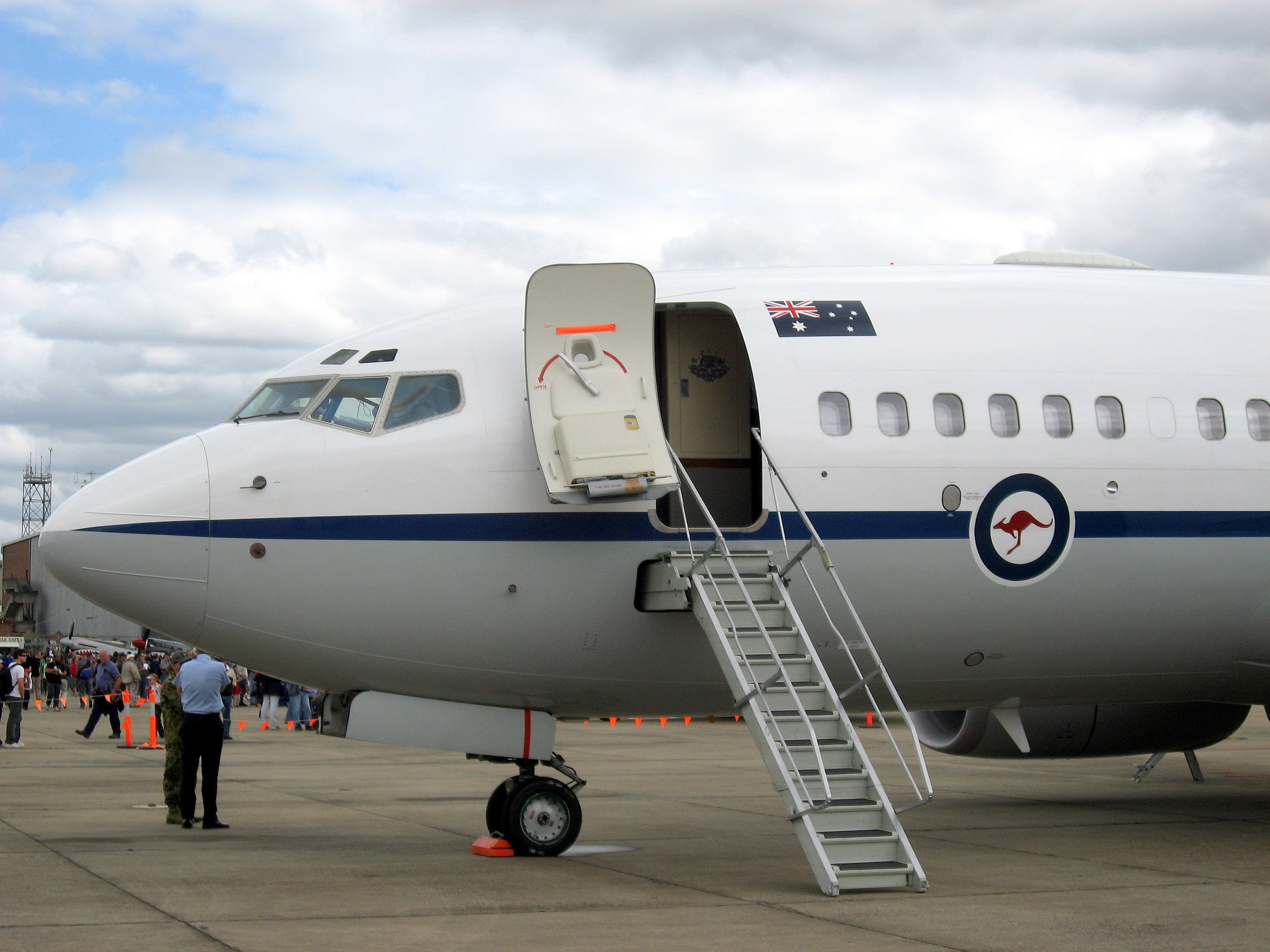
RAAF BBJ1 with stairs deployed

== Current fleet ==
- Dassault Falcon 7X (3 aircraft, 2019–present) – replacement for Challenger 604s
- Boeing 737 MAX 8 BBJ (2 aircraft, 2024–present) – replacement for BBJ1
- Airbus KC-30A (1 aircraft, 2019–present) – MRTT fitted with long-range VIP capability

== History ==
Prior to 1940, there were no dedicated aircraft available for use by federal government ministers. Canberra had become Australia's national capital in 1927, following the relocation of federal parliament from the temporary capital Melbourne, but many government agencies had not yet relocated. This necessitated frequent travel between the two cities for government ministers and their staff. In 1936, Australian National Airways began operating regular commercial air services using D.H.86s. Many members of parliament continued to prefer railway travel, but Prime Minister Joseph Lyons was a regular aircraft passenger and regarded the introduction of dedicated aircraft for cabinet ministers as inevitable. In August 1939, by which time Lyons had died in office and been succeeded by Robert Menzies, a cabinet submission by defence minister Geoffrey Street identified that "special flying arrangements might be necessary for urgent movements which do not fit in with the timetable of the air services". World War II broke out the following month and a War Cabinet was formed, meeting several times a week. As a result, in early 1940 air minister James Fairbairn approved the conversion of four newly ordered Lockheed Hudson bombers into passenger aircraft suitable for ministerial use, to be operated by the Royal Australian Air Force (RAAF).

The "VIP affair" of 1967 arose from the decision by the government and public service to maintain a veil of secrecy over the VIP flights program, attempting to conceal costs, destinations and passengers in order to prevent negative media coverage. This culminated in Prime Minister Harold Holt and Air Minister Peter Howson being found to have misled parliament over the existence of passenger manifests.

== Airbus KC-30A (A39-007) VIP transport ==
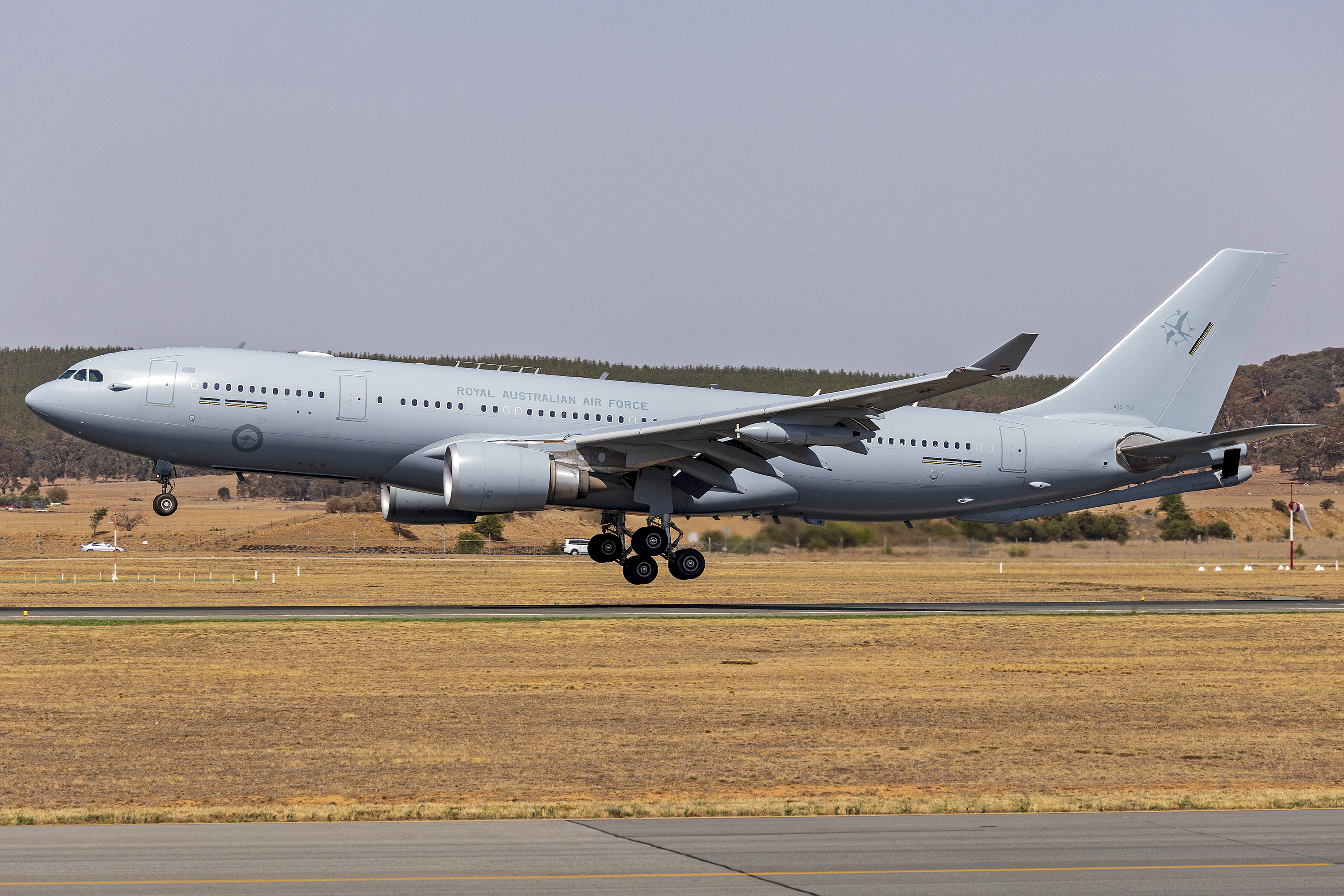
RAAF Airbus KC-30A (A39-007) landing at Canberra Airport in 2020

For long-haul flights, the KC-30A Multi-Role Tanker Transport aircraft (A39-007) will fly with a complement of:

- three pilots
- two air refuelling operators
- eight crew attendants
- one network technician (formerly known as a Communications and Information Systems Controller)
- one catering representative
- five maintenance personnel (flight engineers), consisting of avionics technicians and aircraft technicians, which can be reduced to four if personnel are cross-trained across both trades.

The KC-30A Multi-Role Tanker aircraft incorporates modifications to enable long-range government transport, including enhanced in-air communications capabilities to support secure telecommunications. The modifications enable the business of the government to continue while airborne, with access to unclassified and classified information technology environments and telecommunications.

The VIP cabin interior is configured as follows:

- VIP accommodation area, including two first class seats and seat enclosures
- a large meeting room, which includes ten taxi, take-off and landing-rated seats and a large conference table
- a working area with club-style tables, video-telecommunications equipment and twelve taxi, take-off and landing-rated seats
- washroom facilities

The cabin configuration includes a total of 102 seats, comprising:

- a seating area with 54 standard economy class seats
- a seating area with 24 business class seats (lie-down seats)
- a first class lie-flat seating area for two people
- a secure conference room with ten reclining seats and a table (and five periphery seats which are not certified for take-off or landing)
- a working area with twelve lie-flat seats and tables

== List of former RAAF VIP transport aircraft ==
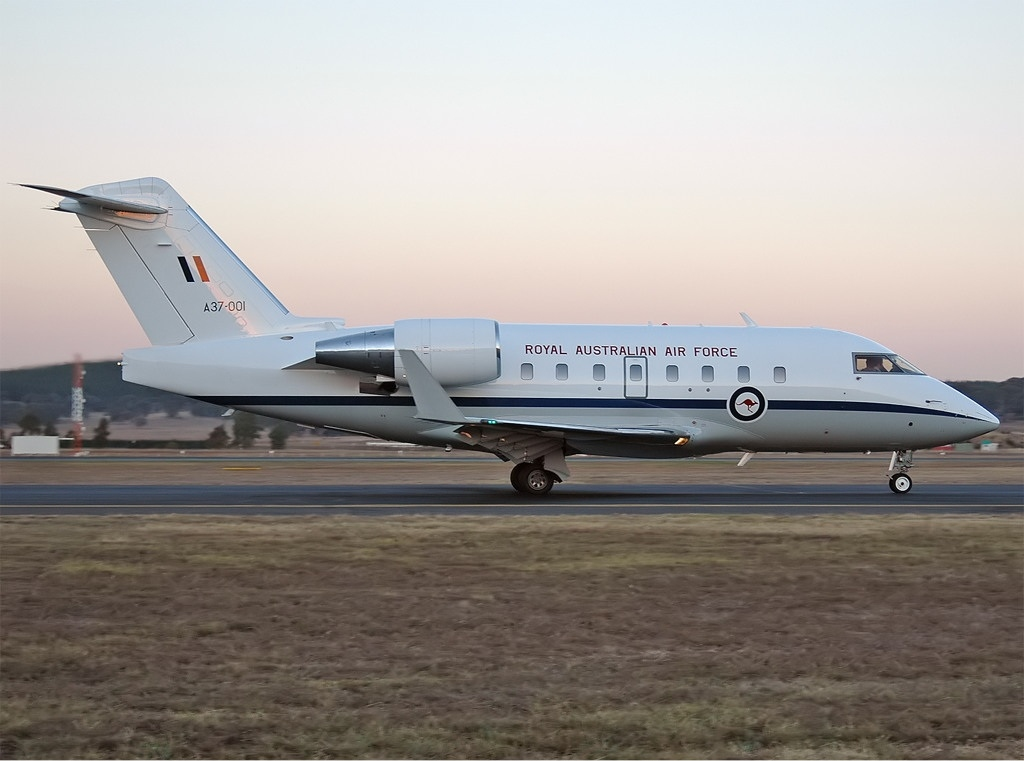
RAAF Challenger 604 in 2004

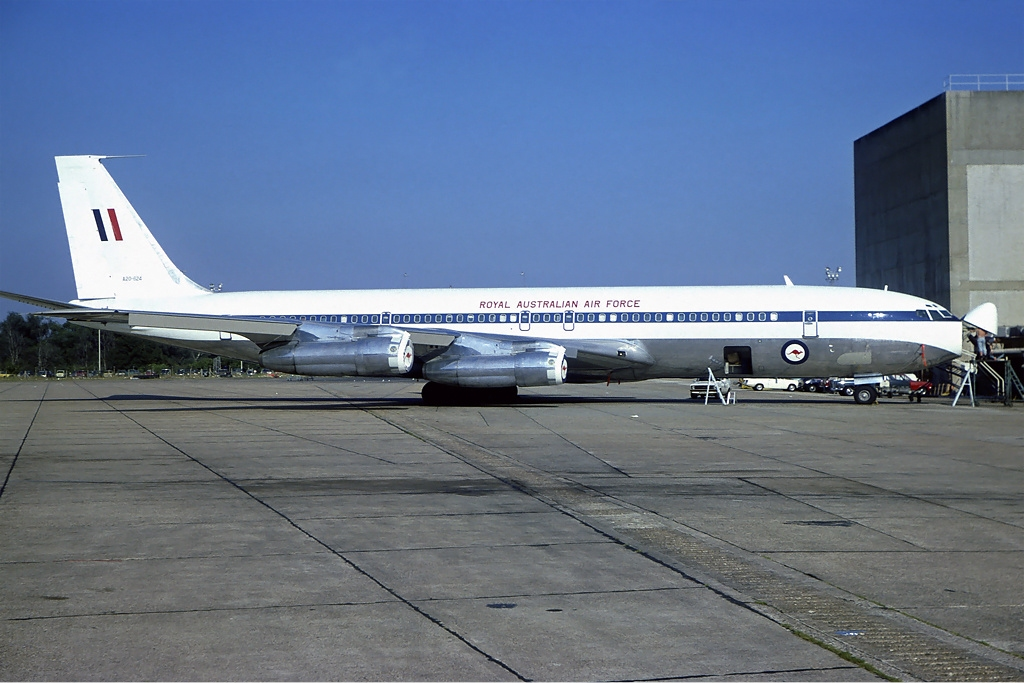
RAAF Boeing 707 at Heathrow Airport, 1979

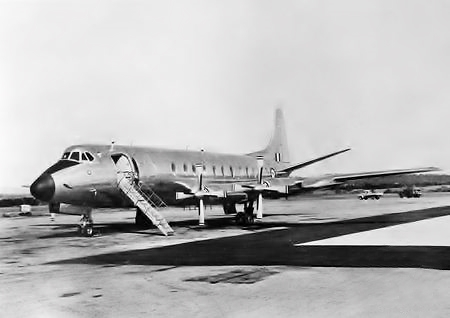
RAAF Vickers Viscount

- Lockheed Hudson (4 aircraft, 1940–?)
- Douglas DC-3 Dakota (VIP aircraft, 1943–?)
- Consolidated Liberator (VIP aircraft, 1944–1948)
- Avro York (1 aircraft, 1945–1947)
- Convair Metropolitan (2 aircraft, 1957–1968)
- Vickers Viscount (2 aircraft, 1964–1969)
- Dassault Mystere 20C (3 aircraft, 1967–1989)
- Hawker Siddeley HS748 (2 VIP aircraft, 1967–1996)
- BAC One-Eleven (2 aircraft, 1968–1989)
- Boeing 707 (4 aircraft, 1979–2008)
- Dassault Falcon 900 (5 aircraft, 1989–2002)
- Challenger 604 (3 aircraft, 2002–2019)
- Boeing 737-700 BBJ (2 aircraft, 2002–2024)

== See also ==
- Air transports of heads of state and government
- 1940 Canberra air disaster
- Garuda Indonesia Flight 200
- VIP affair
- Transportation of the Prime Minister of Australia
- Royal visits to Australia
