= Imperial Gift =

Donation of aircraft by Britain after World War I

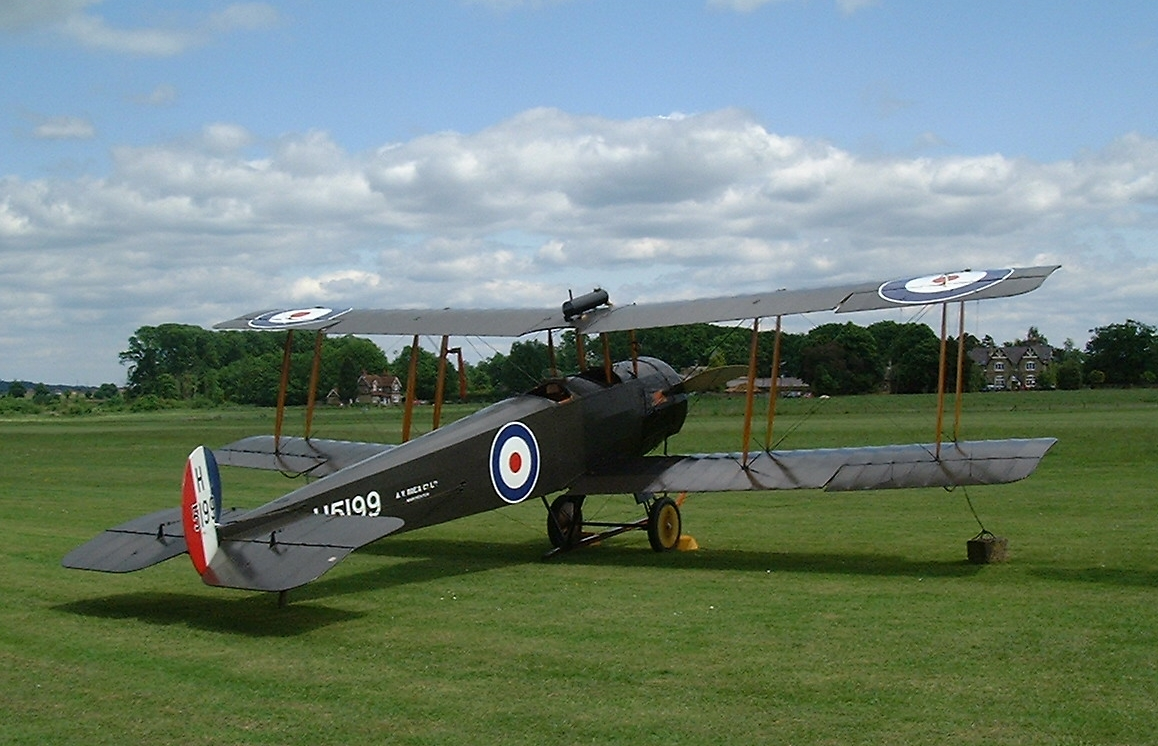
Avro 504 trainers made up some of the Imperial Gift aircraft sent to Britain's dominions.

The Imperial Gift was the donation of aircraft from surplus stocks in Britain after World War I to the dominions of the British Empire: Canada, Australia, New Zealand, South Africa and India. On 29 May 1919, the Cabinet of the United Kingdom agreed to give 100 aircraft to the dominions in addition to replacements for aircraft donated to Britain during the war. These aircraft formed the core of newly established air forces in several dominions.

In Canada, the 100 British-supplied aircraft, supplemented by another 20, were used to establish the Canadian Air Force in 1920 and Royal Canadian Air Force from 1924. Australia's 100 aircraft, supplemented by an additional 28, were used to establish the Royal Australian Air Force in 1921. New Zealand initially refused the Imperial Gift but later accepted a reduced allotment of 34 aircraft. Most were loaned to private aviation companies, but were returned to government control in the mid-1920s and used to establish the New Zealand Permanent Air Force.

South Africa's 100 Imperial Gift aircraft, supplemented by another 13, led to the establishment of the South African Air Force in 1920. The colonial government of India accepted 100 aircraft but did not use them to establish an Indian air force. Twenty were allocated to the Royal Air Force, while 80 were used by various civil government departments or sold to private operators.

== Background ==
Following the First World War, the Royal Air Force had an estimated 20,000 surplus aircraft or more, many still in production at the end of the war. Sir Hugh Trenchard, Chief of the Air Staff, argued for the establishment of air forces in the Dominions. He further argued that a coordinated uniform approach to organising and equipping these air forces was essential to facilitate the air component of the defence of the empire.

This proposal was taken up by the Secretary of State for Air, John Edward Bernard Seely, who described it as being "an opportunity of giving assistance to Dominions which will be valued by them and which should be of great use in the general interest of the defence of the Empire by Air." The British Cabinet approved the proposal on 29 May 1919, though it chose to widen it by offering aircraft to the colonial governments as well as those of the Dominions. These governments were notified of the offer on 4 June.

== Canada ==
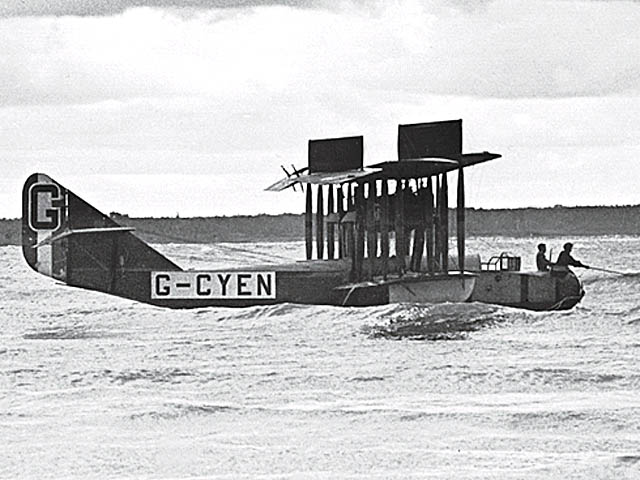
Felixstowe F.3, c.1920 that served in the Royal Canadian Air Force, originally part of the Imperial Gift.

While 22,812 Canadian military personnel had served in the Royal Flying Corps (RFC), Royal Naval Air Service (RNAS) and RAF, Canadian air services were not created and did not operate as an independent military force until nearly the end of the war. With 1 Squadron and 2 Squadron of the Canadian Air Force established at Upper Heyford in Britain during August 1918 and the Royal Canadian Naval Air Service, established for home defence in September 1918, Canadian units had only reached operational status by the end of hostilities and never saw combat.

In 1919, when the Canadian Air Board Director of Flying Operations, Lieutenant Colonel Robert Leckie studied the types that were being offered, he specified aircraft that would be suitable for civil operations as the peacetime force would undertake a number of roles that involved surveillance, fire-fighting and mapping. Although combat aircraft were offered from the large stock of surplus aircraft, Canada's share of the Imperial Gift mainly consisted of the following 114 "multi-purpose" aircraft, although a small number of fighters were also included:

- 62 × Avro 504 trainers
- 10 × Airco DH.4 bombers
- 12 × Airco DH.9A bombers
- 12 × Royal Aircraft Factory SE.5a fighters
- 8 × Felixstowe F.3 patrol flying boats
- 2 × Curtiss H.16 patrol flying boats
- 2 × Bristol F.2B Fighter two seat fighters
- 2 × Sopwith Snipe fighters
- 1 × Fairey IIIc patrol seaplane

The final deliveries included six non-rigid airships, several kite balloons and additional obsolete aircraft (possibly for ground instructional purposes), including two Royal Aircraft Factory B.E.2Cs, and single examples of a Royal Aircraft Factory F.E.2D and a Vickers F.B.9, along with some replacement airframes. These brought the total to 120 aircraft. In addition to the aircraft, numerous spares were sent, including engines and ancillary equipment such as cameras and seaplane beaching gear, along with 300 support vehicles consisting of motor transports, trailers and motorcycles. The value of the Imperial Gift was about $5 million, more money than the Canadian government spent on aviation from 1919 to 1923.

The Imperial Gift aircraft formed the basis of the postwar Canadian Air Force (CAF), later the Royal Canadian Air Force. In 1920, the Canadian Air Board sponsored a project to conduct the first Trans-Canada flight to determine the feasibility of such flights for air mail and passenger services. Rivière du Loup to Winnipeg was flown by Leckie and Major Basil Hobbs in a Felixstowe F.3 and the remainder of the relay was completed using several of the CAF's DH-9As. All aircraft were part of the Imperial Gift. Although not considered suitable for the harsh Canadian weather, the Imperial Gift aircraft soldiered on into the 1930s. The last aircraft in service, an Avro 504K, was only retired in 1934.

== Australia ==
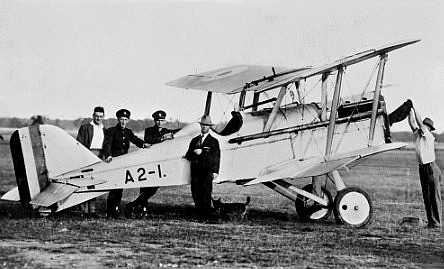
RAAF Imperial Gift S.E.5a fighter

The Imperial Gift to Australia originally consisted of 100 aircraft, spare engines, tools, motor transport and 13 transportable hangars shipped in over 19,000 packing cases. An additional 28 aircraft were provided at the same time to replace aircraft donated by the people of Australia to Great Britain during the First World War. Australia's aircraft allotment consisted of:

- 35 × Avro 504K trainers
- 35 × Royal Aircraft Factory S.E.5a fighters
- 30 × Airco DH.9A bombers
- 28 × Airco DH.9 bombers

On 30 June 1919, the Australian Army Service Corps recommended the creation of a temporary Australian Air Corps (AAC) formed into two wings (one wing to meet the needs of the Navy and the other for the Army). The Imperial Gift enabled the formation of the Royal Australian Air Force on 31 March 1921. An Air Board, answering to the Minister for Defence, would administer the new service.

Imperial Gift aircraft were shipped to Australia in 1919, assembled upon delivery in 1920 and served for up to 10 years. Airco DH.9A A1-17/F2779 was the longest serving Imperial Gift aircraft, being written off on 4 February 1930. The only original surviving Imperial Gift aircraft in Australia are Avro 504K A3-4/H2174, stored at the Treloar Technology Centre (Canberra) and S.E.5a A2-4/C1916, exhibited in the ANZAC Hall of the main Australian War Memorial displays in the Australian War Memorial.

== New Zealand ==
At first the New Zealand Government refused the Imperial Gift, but later accepted 34 aircraft and 42 aero engines:

- 21 × Avro 504K trainers
- 9 × Airco DH.9 bombers
- 2 × Bristol F.2B Fighter two seat fighters
- 2 × Airco DH.4 bombers

The F.2Bs, DH-4s and one Avro 504K were retained for government use, and the balance were issued on loan as transports and training aircraft to civil aviation companies between 1920 and 1924. By the mid-1920s, all of the private firms involved had collapsed, and surviving aircraft were taken back by the government to constitute the New Zealand Permanent Air Force.

All Imperial Gift aircraft in military service were either wrecked, scrapped or burnt and nothing has survived.

== South Africa ==
South Africa was the second country after Britain to establish an air force independent from army or naval control on 1 February 1920. The South African Air Force's (SAAF) share of the Imperial Gift was:

- 48 × Airco DH.9 bombers
- 30 × Avro 504 trainers
- 22 × Royal Aircraft Factory SE.5a fighters
- 10 × Airco DH.4 bombers

The 10 DH-4s were war loss replacements sponsored by the Over-Seas Club of London. An additional DH-9 was donated by the city of Birmingham. The SAAF's initial fleet was completed by two Royal Aircraft Factory B.E.2s left over from Allister Miller's wartime recruitment campaign and handed over to the Union Defence Force in October 1919. No records have been found of the B.E.2s being used after 1919.

The ancillary equipment and materials from the donation included 20 steel hangars, 30 portable wood and canvas Bessonneau hangars, radio and photographic equipment, complete engine and airframe workshops with tools, trucks, tenders, trailers, 50,000 imp gal (230,000 L; 60,000 US gal) of engine oils and 20,000 imp gal (91,000 L; 24,000 US gal) of paints, varnishes and dope. The total value of the donation was estimated at £2,000,000.

An offer of four Type Zero airships was turned down due to doubts about their usability above 6,000 ft (1,800 m) and the expense of replacing the envelopes, which were estimated to have a useful life of only three months in the harsh South African sunshine.

The first batch of aircraft arrived in South Africa in September 1919 at the Artillery Depot at Roberts Heights, Pretoria where an Air Depot was established on 1 January 1920. The combined facility was then known as the Aircraft and Artillery Depot.

Two Avro 504s were sold for £1,563-11s-8d to the South African Aerial Transport Company in 1920.

A 23.5 morgen (20.1 hectare) piece of land two miles east of Roberts Heights was acquired for an aerodrome and named Zwartkop after a nearby hill. No. 1 Flight was formed at Zwartkop Air Force Station on 26 April 1920, equipped with DH-9s. After the formation of a second flight, 1 Squadron was established in early 1922.

The SAAF Museum's Pretoria branch is housed in six of the original steel hangars.

== India ==
India's share of the Imperial Gift was:

- 60 × Airco DH.9 bombers
- 40 × Avro 504 trainers

Unlike other recipients, India did not use the gift to establish a national air force. The RAF in India received 20 Avro 504s for military use. The rest went to various colonial government departments and entities, or were sold to commercial and private operators.

The remains of three DH-9s were discovered in 1995 in disused elephant stables at the palace of the Maharajah of Bikaner. Taken to the Imperial War Museum (IWM) in the UK, parts of all three were used to restore one of the aircraft, with the addition of an engine the IWM had in storage. It is on display at the IWM's Duxford facility.
