= No. 1 Aircraft Depot RAAF =

Royal Australian Air Force maintenance unit

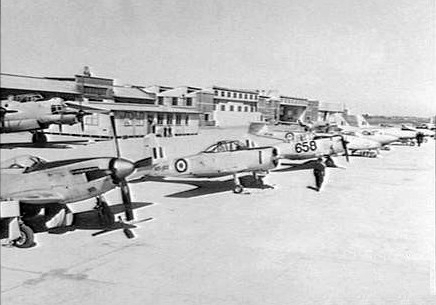
- Aircraft on display at No. 1 Aircraft Depot, September 1955
- Active: 1921–94
- Allegiance: Australia
- Branch: Royal Australian Air Force
- Role: Aircraft maintenance
- Part of: Southern Area Command (1940–42); No. 4 Maintenance Group (1942–53); Maintenance Command (1953–59); Support Command (1959–90); Logistics Command (1990–94)
- Garrison/HQ: RAAF Point Cook (1921–26); RAAF Laverton (1926–94)
- Motto: Providemus ("We foresee")

Commanders
- Notable commanders: William Anderson (1921, 1929); Adrian Cole (1929–32); Frank McNamara (1933–36); Frank Lukis (1936–38); Arthur Murphy (1938–40); John Lerew (1942–43)

No. 1 Aircraft Depot (No. 1 AD) was a maintenance unit of the Royal Australian Air Force (RAAF). Formed in July 1921 at RAAF Point Cook, Victoria, it relocated to the nearby RAAF Laverton in March 1926. As well as servicing aircraft and other equipment, in its early years, the depot supported survey flights in Australia and the Pacific region. It was also responsible for training maintenance staff.

No. 1 AD's strength increased from 350 staff in the 1930s to over 2,000 during World War II, when it assembled, tested and repaired aircraft ranging from Tiger Moth trainers to Spitfire fighters to B-17 Flying Fortress heavy bombers. It also undertook aircraft research and development.

Shortly after the war, No. 1 AD introduced the first jets into RAAF service. In 1961, it ceased airframe maintenance but continued to service aero engines. By the 1970s, the depot's main focus was ground-based equipment, though it still handled some aircraft components. No. 1 AD was disbanded in December 1994, its functions having been taken over by other units and private contractors. At the time of its disbandment, it was the oldest RAAF unit in continuous operation.

== History ==
=== Pre-war years ===
No. 1 Aircraft Depot (No. 1 AD) was one of the first units formed by the Royal Australian Air Force after the new service was established (initially as the Australian Air Force) on 31 March 1921. The original components of No. 1 AD became known as such in April 1921, though the unit did not formally come into existence until July. Prior to this it comprised two elements in Melbourne, one at Spotswood handling the equipment of the Imperial Gift (128 surplus aircraft and associated spare parts donated by Great Britain following World War I) and another at Fitzroy North responsible for motor vehicle repair. When No. 1 AD was officially established at RAAF Point Cook, Victoria, on 1 July, the Spotswood component was dissolved, while North Fitzroy continued to operate as a detachment. The unit's inaugural commanding officer was Squadron Leader Bill Anderson, who was also in overall charge of Point Cook.

In January 1922, the depot was organised into a headquarters that controlled stores, aircraft repair, and engine repair sections. The vehicle repair section at North Fitzroy was transferred to Point Cook that April. Point Cook's corrosive seaside atmosphere was deemed an unsuitable long-term location for aircraft maintenance; the base also lacked railway infrastructure, necessary for transporting large aircraft parts. In September 1921, the government had purchased land at Laverton near a railway station eight kilometres (five miles) inland from Point Cook for the express purpose of constructing a dedicated home for No. 1 AD as the "warehouse of the Air Force". The depot, staffed by eight officers and seventy-seven other ranks, relocated to the new base on 1 March 1926. It occupied a large hangar that included an administration block, which, along with living quarters and ancillary buildings, had cost £300,000 to build.

As well as receiving, assembling, testing and maintaining RAAF equipment, No. 1 AD was responsible for supporting research flights. In July 1927, it was the departure point for the Northern Survey Flight, comprising a de Havilland DH.50 and two Airco DH.9s, which reconnoitred air routes and landing grounds in northern and central Australia under the command of the Chief of the Air Staff, Wing Commander Richard Williams. The following month, No. 1 AD formed the Papuan Survey Flight, consisting of two Supermarine Seagull III amphibious biplanes under the command of Flight Lieutenant Ellis Wackett, to photograph the Papuan and New Guinean coasts as far north as Aitape. Anderson, now a wing commander, returned to command the depot from April to August 1929, handing over to Wing Commander Adrian Cole, who served in the post until December 1932.

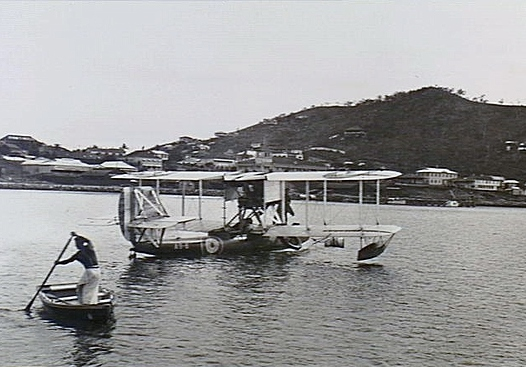
Supermarine Seagull A9-6, which was part of the 1927 Papuan Survey Flight formed by No. 1 AD

By the mid-1930s, No. 1 AD comprised 350 staff; the overall strength of the RAAF at this time was under 2,000. The depot serviced a range of aircraft that included the Westland Wapiti, Bristol Bulldog, Hawker Demon, de Havilland Dragon Rapide, Avro Cadet, Avro Anson, and North American NA-16. The NA-16 was later augmented by the purchase of the more advanced North American NA-33, which was licensed and built in Australia by the Commonwealth Aircraft Corporation as the CAC Wirraway. To cope with the Government's decision to rapidly expand the RAAF, a Recruit Training Section, incorporating the nascent School of Armaments and Signals, was formed under the depot's auspices by Flight Lieutenant Charles Eaton on 1 March 1935; it was reorganised as Recruit Training Squadron on 1 September 1936. No. 1 AD also commenced formal training courses for aircraft fitters and riggers in 1935, leading to the formation of No. 1 School of Technical Training five years later.

In December 1935, No. 1 AD's workshops, under the command of Squadron Leader Arthur Murphy, specially modified a Wapiti and a de Havilland Gipsy Moth for Antarctic conditions to enable an Air Force team led by Flight Lieutenant (later Group Captain) Eric Douglas and Flying Officer Alister Murdoch to rescue explorer Lincoln Ellsworth, who was presumed lost on a journey across the continent. On 3 May 1937, Recruit Training Squadron acquired a new sub-unit, the Communications and Survey Flight, utilising Tugan Gannets and Dragon Rapides for ongoing photographic survey work; the squadron was re-formed as No. 1 Recruit Depot on 2 March 1940. Coupled with its aircraft assembly and test facilities, the recruit training unit made Laverton an obvious choice for the establishment of future RAAF squadrons. No. 1 AD's commanding officers during this decade included Wing Commanders Frank McNamara (February 1933 to April 1936), Frank Lukis (April 1936 to January 1938), and Arthur Murphy (January 1938 to May 1940).

=== World War II ===
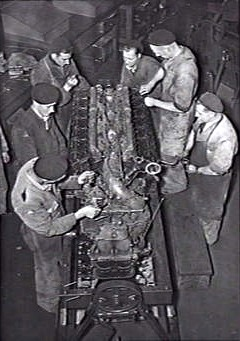
Fitters at No. 1 AD assembling a Rolls-Royce Merlin engine after a full overhaul, May 1944

Although many squadrons were raised at RAAF Station Laverton during World War II, the base's prime focus continued to be its aircraft depot. Following the outbreak of hostilities in September 1939, No. 1 AD began expanding to handle the RAAF's growing number of training and combat aircraft, among them the Wirraway, de Havilland Tiger Moth, Lockheed Hudson, Hawker Hurricane, and Curtiss P-40 Kittyhawk. The depot assembled and tested new aircraft, and ferried them to operational areas such as northern Australia and New Guinea. It was also responsible for the maintenance of in-service aircraft, including their engines, instruments, and armament. As well as RAAF equipment, No. 1 AD repaired battle-damaged US aircraft such as B-17 Flying Fortresses.

In March 1940, the RAAF began dividing Australia and New Guinea into geographically-based command-and-control zones. No. 1 AD came under the auspices of Southern Area Command, which was headquartered in Melbourne and was responsible for RAAF units located in Victoria, South Australia and Tasmania. The depot spawned Nos. 1 and 2 Aircraft Parks, which were dedicated to aircraft assembly, in April–May 1940 and No. 1 Replenishing Unit, which was responsible for the upkeep of ordnance and ammunition at units in Southern Area, in June 1942. In October that year, control of No. 1 AD was transferred from Southern Area Command to the recently formed No. 4 Maintenance Group, also headquartered in Melbourne, which took over responsibility for maintenance units in Victoria, South Australia and Tasmania.

No. 1 AD undertook research and development on aircraft such as the Supermarine Spitfire, CAC Boomerang, and Wackett Woomera. It also ran comparative performance studies on Spitfires, Boomerangs, Kittyhawks, Brewster Buffalos, and Mitsubishi Zeros. In the case of the Boomerang, 105 CA-12 models were delivered to No. 1 AD for testing between July 1942 and June 1943. As soon as the aircraft began arriving, the depot commenced handling and armament trials that continued for six months, identifying and overcoming such issues as the aircraft's guns freezing at high altitudes, and unusual levels of carbon monoxide in the cockpit. Fighter aces Alan Rawlinson and Wilfred Arthur, along with a United States Army Air Forces pilot, conducted comparative trials between a Boomerang, a Kittyhawk, a Buffalo, and a Bell Airacobra. The depot began despatching the Boomerangs to their operational units in March 1943, and the following month performance-tested a turbocharged version of the CA-14, though this model never entered production. No. 1 AD's Special Duties and Performance Flight was responsible for conducting performance trials during the early war years; in December 1943 it became a separate organisation, No. 1 Aircraft Performance Unit, which would evolve into the Aircraft Research and Development Unit (ARDU) in 1947.

One of the depot's wartime commanding officers was Wing Commander John Lerew, who held the post from December 1942 until November 1943. During his tenure, after investigating the crash of a Vultee Vengeance, he designed a clip to prevent the accidental release of the pilot's safety harness, which was later adopted for all such harnesses. By January 1945, No. 1 AD's strength had increased to its highest level of 2,339 staff.

=== Post-war years ===
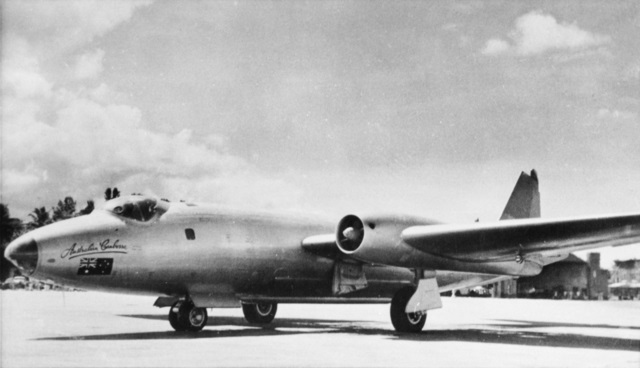
RAAF Canberra bomber during the 1953 London-to-Christchurch air race; three aircraft were specially modified by No. 1 AD to take part in the event.

After the war, No. 1 AD was responsible for introducing the first jets into RAAF service. A Gloster Meteor made its first flight in Australia from Laverton in 1946. By May 1947, No. 1 AD had assembled the first de Havilland Vampire jet in Australia for its maiden flight. In October the same year, the first helicopter in RAAF service, a Sikorsky S-51, arrived at the depot. That month, No. 1 AD also completed fitting out a Douglas Dakota with an office, a lounge suite, and a kitchenette for service as the Governor-General's VIP transport, operated out of Laverton by No. 1 Communication Unit. In 1950, the depot received the sole high-performance piston-engined CAC CA-15 to be built, which had been sent to be "converted to components" (scrapped). No. 1 AD took delivery of the first Australian-built English Electric Canberra jet bomber in July 1953. Shortly afterwards, it modified the three Canberras of No. 1 Long Range Flight prior to the unit taking part in the 1953 London-to-Christchurch air race. In September that year, the first Australian-built Sabre jet fighter was delivered.

As part of the RAAF's reorganisation from a geographically-based command-and-control system to one based on function, No. 4 Maintenance Group was superseded by Maintenance Command on 1 October 1953. In September 1959, No. 1 AD came under the control of Support Command, formed when Maintenance Command was amalgamated with Training Command. Between June 1950 and October 1960, No. 1 AD maintained a detachment at RAAF Station Tocumwal, New South Wales, to store obsolete aircraft awaiting disposal.

By 1961, when all airframe maintenance at Laverton was transferred to Nos. 2 and 3 Aircraft Depots, No. 1 AD had serviced forty-two aircraft types throughout its existence. It continued to maintain aero engines and began supporting telecommunications equipment as well. The aircraft engine repair facilities at No. 1 AD were closed down in 1968. Staff were transferred to No. 3 Aircraft Depot at RAAF Base Amberley, Queensland, to prepare for the introduction of the General Dynamics F-111C swing-wing bomber to Australian service and concentrate on maintaining the new aircraft's engines. No. 1 AD's focus thereafter shifted to ground support, manufacturing, installing, servicing and providing training for navigational, air traffic control, telecommunications and motor transport equipment used by the Air Force and other sections of Defence and government. From 1968 to 1977, the depot was organised into two components, Telecommunications Installation and Maintenance Squadron and Ground Equipment Maintenance Squadron. These were subdivided in February 1977 into Telecommunications Squadron (maintaining ground communications equipment for control towers, transmitters and receiving stations in Australia and the region), Radar Squadron (supporting surveillance systems at RAAF Bases Williamtown, Amberley, Townsville, Darwin and Pearce), Ground Equipment Maintenance Squadron (maintaining motor transport and other ground-based mechanical and electro-mechanical systems) and Intermediate Level Maintenance Squadron (communications, navigation and other ground-based maintenance at Laverton, as well as spectrometric analysis of oil used by the RAAF in aircraft and other equipment).

On 6 November 1981, the Governor-General, Sir Zelman Cowen, presented the Queen's Colour to No. 1 AD. By September the following year, the depot's strength was down to 235 staff, but it pioneered the support of new technologies for the Air Force in such fields as electroplating, fibre optics, and electronics. It was also responsible for developing and testing components for the F-111, Macchi MB-326 and McDonnell Douglas F/A-18 Hornet jets. From 1986, restructuring and outsourcing began to impact heavily upon the RAAF's technical services. In February 1990, No. 1 AD came under the control of Logistics Command, formed when Support Command was split into logistical and training components. By then, the depot's functions had largely been taken over by other units and private contractors, and it was disbanded on 2 December 1994. No. 1 AD was, at the time, the oldest RAAF unit in continuous operation and, according to the RAAF Historical Section, the oldest continuously operating maintenance depot of any air force.

== Commanding officers ==
No. 1 AD was commanded by the following officers:

From	Name	From	Name
July 1921	Squadron Leader W.H. Anderson	March 1956	Wing Commander R.W.T. Ayre
February 1922	Squadron Leader A. Murray-Jones	March 1957	Group Captain J.P. Godsell
July 1922	Flight Lieutenant W.A. Coates	January 1959	Wing Commander R.W.T. Ayre
February 1923	Squadron Leader T. R. Marsden	June 1959	Group Captain A.G. Pither
May 1924	Flight Lieutenant E.J. Howells	September 1959	Wing Commander R.W.T. Ayre
December 1925	Flight Lieutenant R. Christie	January 1960	Wing Commander A.G. Pither
March 1926	Wing Commander P.A. McBain	June 1961	Wing Commander F.M. Timms
January 1929	Squadron Leader J.R. Bell	September 1962	Wing Commander J.R. Lavers
April 1929	Wing Commander W.H. Anderson	February 1966	Wing Commander D.M. Furler
August 1929	Wing Commander A.T. Cole	January 1968	Wing Commander R.K. Starkie
December 1932	Squadron Leader R. Christie	June 1968	Wing Commander H.J. Gent
January 1933	Squadron Leader A.W. Murphy	September 1968	Squadron Leader R.R. Prowse
February 1933	Wing Commander F.W. McNamara	May 1969	Wing Commander D.C. Mazlin
April 1936	Wing Commander F.W.F. Lukis	November 1971	Wing Commander J.C. Swales
January 1938	Wing Commander A.W. Murphy	January 1974	Wing Commander G. Grantham
May 1940	Wing Commander C.E. Douglas	June 1974	Wing Commander J.O.F. Philip
July 1942	Wing Commander J.C. Stevenson	January 1977	Wing Commander C.R.A. Ely
December 1942	Wing Commander J.M Lerew	February 1979	Squadron Leader P.J. Winyard
November 1943	Wing Commander S.DeB. Griffiths	March 1979	Wing Commander D.K. Leslie
October 1945	Group Captain C.McK. Henry	January 1982	Wing Commander L.J. Crowley
November 1949	Wing Commander K.P. Connolly	January 1984	Wing Commander T.J. Kelly
July 1951	Wing Commander E.F. Easterbrook	June 1985	Wing Commander R.I. Gretton
May 1953	Group Captain E.V. Millett	December 1987	Wing Commander P.J. McDonald
October 1954	Wing Commander A.T. Fay	January 1990	Wing Commander T.C. Smith
June 1955	Group Captain J.W.C. Black	January 1993	Wing Commander M.W. Shaw

== See also ==
- South West Pacific theatre of World War II
