= Lerew =

Lerew is a surname. Notable people with the surname include:

- Anthony Lerew (born 1982), American baseball player
- John Lerew (1912–1996), Royal Australian Air Force officer

== See also ==
- Laroo (disambiguation)
- LeDrew
- Leroux (surname)
