= Pither =

Pither is a surname. Notable people with the surname include:

- Alfred George Pither (1908–1971), Australian Air Force officer
- Chris Pither, New Zealand racing driver
- Herbert Pither, New Zealand aviator
- Luke Pither, Canadian hockey player
- George Pither, English football player
