= No. 540 Squadron RAF =

Photoreconnaissance squadron of the Royal Air Force

- Active: 19 Oct 1942 – 30 Sep 1946; 1 Dec 1947 – 31 Mar 1956
- Country: United Kingdom
- Branch: Royal Air Force
- Role: Photographic reconnaissance
- Part of: No. 18 Group RAF, Coastal Command; No. 16 Group RAF, Coastal Command; No. 106 Group RAF, Coastal Command
- Mottos: Latin: Sine qua non (Translation: "Indispensable")

Insignia
- Squadron Badge heraldry: A mosquito The badge indicates the squadron as the first user of the de Havilland Mosquito
- Squadron Codes: DH (Nov 1945 – Sep 1946 and Dec 1947 – Aug 1953)

No. 540 Squadron RAF was a photoreconnaissance squadron of the Royal Air Force from 1942 to 1956.

== History ==
=== Formation and World War II ===
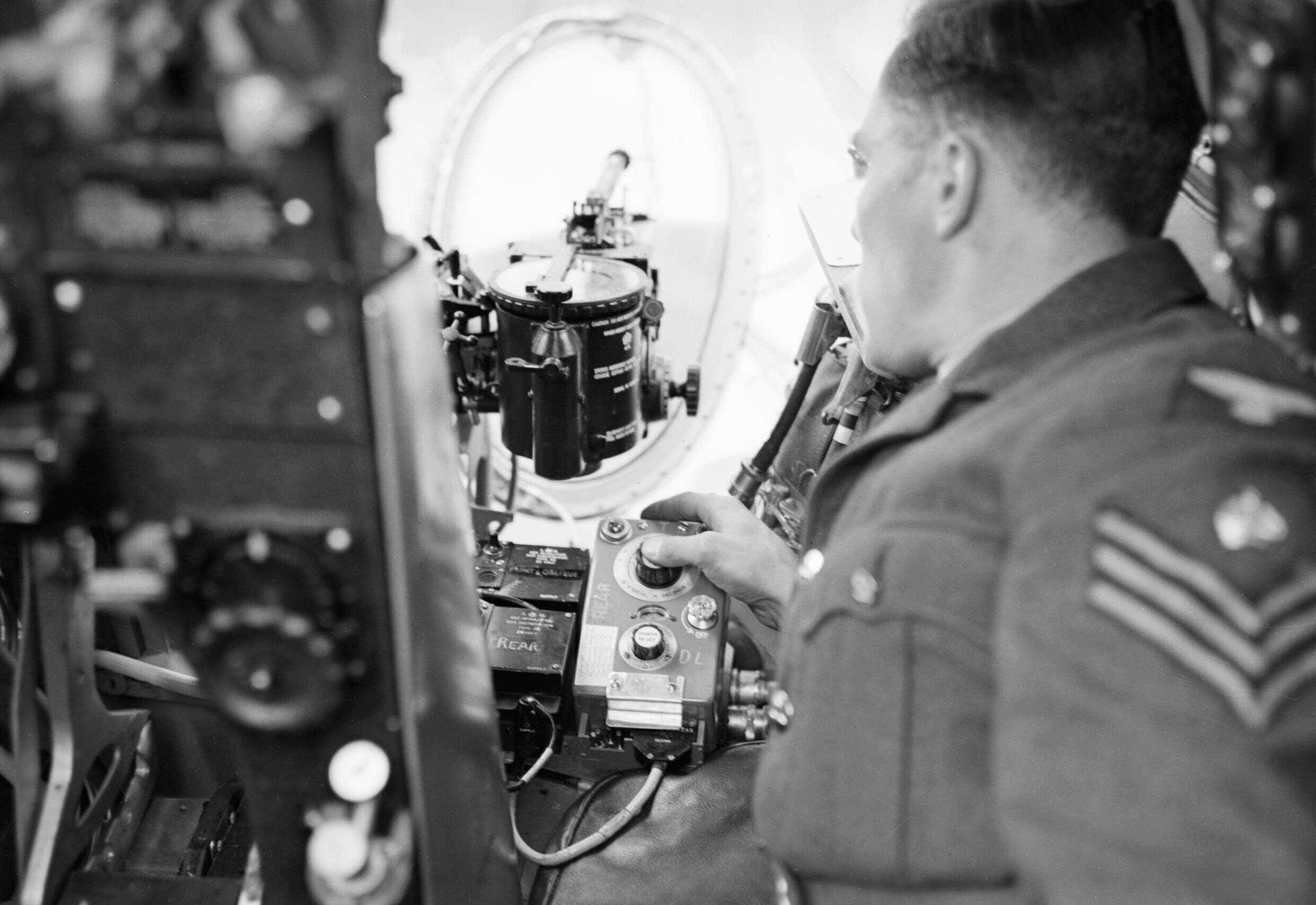
A ground crew sergeant demonstrates the operation of the photo-reconnaissance camera in one of No. 540 Squadron's de Havilland Mosquitos at Benson

The squadron was formed on 19 October 1942 from 'H' and 'L' flights of No. 1 PRU at RAF Leuchars as a photoreconnaissance unit with the de Havilland Mosquito. It operated from Leuchars to carry out missions over Norway and Germany, while a detachment based at RAF Benson carried out similar missions over France and Italy. Another detachment, based at RAF Gibraltar covered the south of France and Algeria, but from 1944 on the unit was wholly based at RAF Benson, the range of the later Mosquito permitting missions deep in Austria or to the Canary Islands. In March 1945 the squadron went overseas, to Coulommiers in France, coming back to the UK in November, again at RAF Benson where the unit was disbanded on 30 September 1946, when it was renumbered to 58 Squadron.

=== Post-war ===
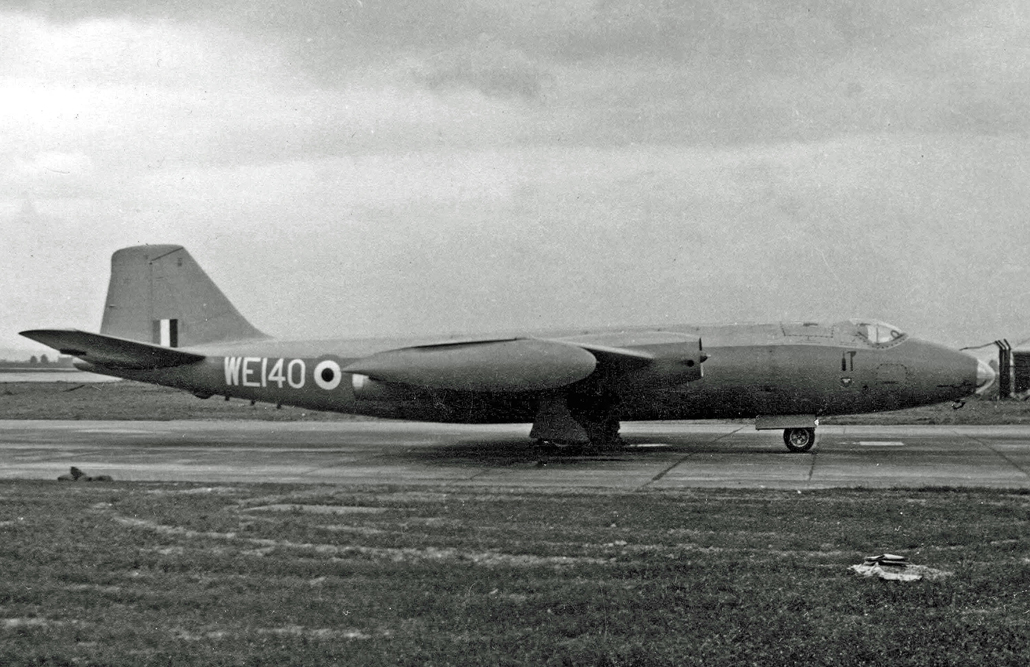
540 Squadron Canberra PR.3 at London Heathrow airport in June 1953

On 1 December 1947 No. 540 squadron was reformed at Benson, from the Mosquito element of 58 Squadron, taking up its old role and flying Mosquitoes again. In December 1952 these gave way to English Electric Canberras, the last Mosquito leaving in September 1953. By that time the squadron had moved to RAF Wyton, where the unit disbanded on 31 March 1956.

== 1953 London to Christchurch air race ==
In 1953 the squadron formed a "NZ Air Race Flight" to train and carry out the RAF participation in the 1953 London to Christchurch air race, Flight Lieutenant Monty Burton won the race in Canberra PR3 WE139 now on public display at the Royal Air Force Museum.

== Aircraft operated ==
Aircraft operated by no. 540 Squadron RAF, data from
From	To	Aircraft	Version
October 1942	December 1942	Supermarine Spitfire	Mk.IV
October 1942	May 1943	de Havilland Mosquito	Mk.I
October 1942	September 1943	de Havilland Mosquito	Mk.IV
December 1942	September 1943	de Havilland Mosquito	Mk.VIII
July 1943	March 1945	de Havilland Mosquito	Mk.IX
May 1944	September 1946	de Havilland Mosquito	Mk.XVI
November 1944	September 1945	de Havilland Mosquito	Mk.VI
November 1944	November 1945	de Havilland Mosquito	Mk.XXXII
November 1945	October 1946	de Havilland Mosquito	Mk.XXXIV
December 1947	October 1951	de Havilland Mosquito	PR.34
April 1951	September 1953	de Havilland Mosquito	PR.34a
December 1952	March 1956	English Electric Canberra	PR.3
June 1953	September 1954	English Electric Canberra	B.2
May 1954	March 1956	English Electric Canberra	PR.7

== Squadron bases ==
Bases and airfields used by no. 540 Squadron RAF, data from
From	To	Base	Remark
19 October 1942	29 February 1944	RAF Leuchars, Fife	Dets. At RAF Benson, Oxfordshire and RAF North Front, Gibraltar
29 February 1944	29 March 1945	RAF Benson, Oxfordshire	Dets. at RAF North Front, Gibraltar; RAF Agadir, Morocco; RAF Lossiemouth, Morayshire; Yagodnik, Russia; RAF Dyce, Aberdeenshire and RAF Leuchars, Fife
29 March 1945	23 September 1945	Coulommiers, France	
23 September 1945	6 November 1945	RAF Mount Farm, Oxfordshire	
6 November 1945	30 September 1946	RAF Benson, Oxfordshire	
1 December 1947	26 March 1953	RAF Benson, Oxfordshire	
26 March 1953	31 March 1956	RAF Wyton, Cambridgeshire	

== Commanding officers ==
Officers commanding no. 540 Squadron RAF, data from
From	To	Name
October 1942	May 1943	W/Cdr. M.J.B. Young, DFC
May 1943	March 1944	W/Cdr. Lord M. Douglas-Hamilton, OBE
March 1944	September 1944	W/Cdr. J.R.H. Merifield, DSO, DFC
September 1944		W/Cdr. A.H.W. Ball, DSO, DFC

== See also ==
- List of Royal Air Force aircraft squadrons
