= Peter Raw =

Australian military pilot and officer (1922–1988)

Peter Frank Raw
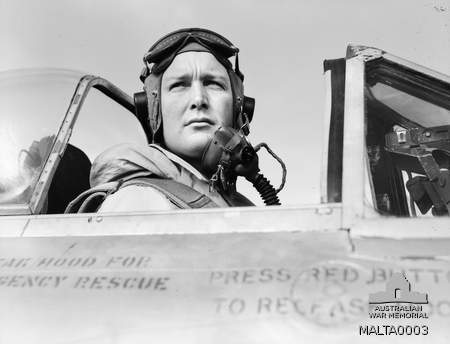
- Squadron Leader Peter Raw in the cockpit of a Vampire aircraft during 1952
- Born: 5 June 1922; Glen Huntly, Victoria
- Died: 14 July 1988 (aged 66); Richmond, Victoria
- Military career
- Branch: Royal Australian Air Force
- Service years: 1941–1978
- Rank: Air Commodore
- Commands: No. 205 Group Communication Squadron RAF (1945); No. 2 Squadron RAAF (1953–1955); No. 1 Long Range Flight RAAF (1953); No. 82 Wing RAAF (1965–1966); RAAF Base Butterworth (1972–1976)
- Conflicts: World War II; Vietnam War
- Awards: Distinguished Service Order; Distinguished Flying Cross; Air Force Cross; Cross of Valour (Poland); Warsaw Uprising Cross (Poland)

Air Commodore Peter Frank Raw, DSO, DFC, AFC (5 June 1922 – 14 July 1988) was a senior officer and pilot in the Royal Australian Air Force (RAAF). He saw combat in a heavy bomber unit in the European theatre during the later stages of World War II and as a senior officer in the Vietnam War, and served in many flying, training and administrative roles.

Raw joined the RAAF in 1941, and served as a flight instructor, bomber pilot and the commander of a communications unit during World War II. After the war he became a specialist navigator. He was appointed commanding officer of the bomber-equipped No. 2 Squadron in January 1953, but temporarily left this position for part of the year to participate in the 1953 London to Christchurch air race, in which he placed second. He returned to lead No. 2 Squadron at the end of 1953 and held the position until 1955.

Raw subsequently served in staff and diplomatic roles until 1965, when he took command of No. 82 Wing, which comprised all of the RAAF's bomber units. Between May 1966 and April 1967, he served as the air support co-ordinator for the Australian forces in South Vietnam. His initial reluctance to commit RAAF helicopters to assist the Australian Army force that was in danger of being defeated during the Battle of Long Tan in August 1966 generated lasting controversy and contributed to a later decision to transfer battlefield helicopters to the Army. Raw served in various staff and training positions until 1972, when he was appointed the commander of RAAF Base Butterworth. He returned to Australia in 1976 and retired from the RAAF two years later.

== Early career ==
Peter Frank Raw was born in the Melbourne suburb of Glen Huntly on 5 June 1922 to Alfred and Eleanor Raw. He was educated at Tooronga Road State School and later attended Melbourne High School. Raw began an electrical apprenticeship at Carlton & United Breweries in 1939, and studied part-time at Melbourne Technical College.

Raw attempted to enlist with the Royal Australian Navy as an electrical artificer in 1941, but was rejected and told to reapply in twelve months. Instead, he joined the RAAF on 15 August that year. He departed Sydney bound for Southern Rhodesia in November 1941 to be trained as a pilot under the Empire Air Training Scheme. Arriving in Southern Rhodesia in January 1942, Raw completed his training and was commissioned as a pilot officer in December that year. He subsequently served as a flying instructor in Southern Rhodesia. In May 1944 Raw became engaged to Dorothy Maggs, whose family lived in Southern Rhodesia and South Africa.

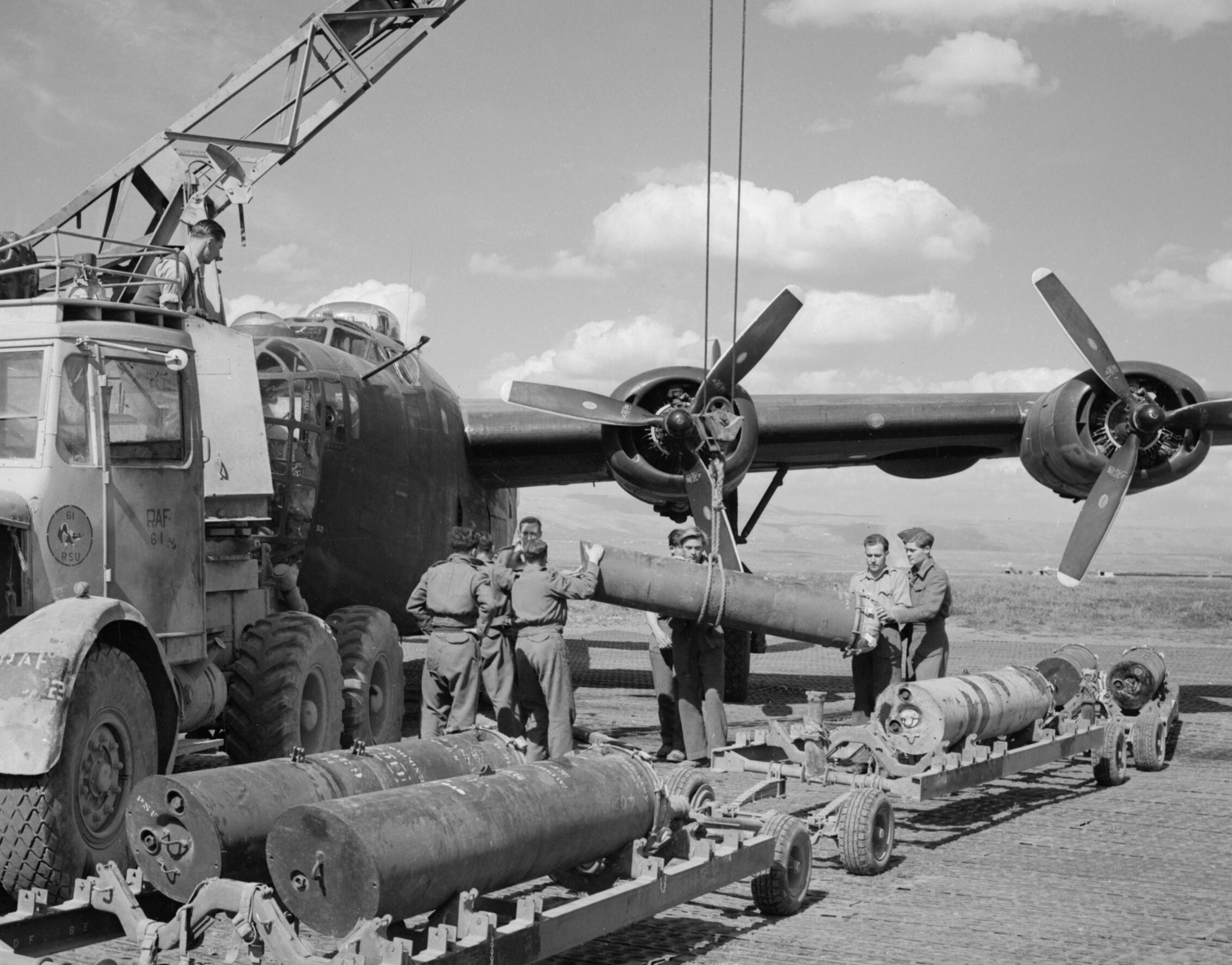
A No. 178 Squadron Liberator being loaded with mines in Italy

In mid-1944, Raw was transferred to Egypt and undertook an operational conversion course that prepared him to fly Consolidated B-24 Liberator heavy bombers in combat. In July that year he was posted to No. 178 Squadron RAF, a British B-24 Liberator unit based near Foggia in southern Italy. While serving with this squadron, Raw took part in operations in the eastern Mediterranean region as well as Hungary, Romania and Yugoslavia. During one of his first combat operations, a raid on an oil refinery near Ploiești in Romania, Raw successfully bombed the target despite heavy anti-aircraft gunfire and later evaded an enemy fighter.

In August 1944 the long-range bomber units controlled by No. 205 Group RAF, including No. 178 Squadron, took part in the Warsaw airlift to supply the Polish Home Army during the Warsaw Uprising. These missions were very challenging due to the long duration of the flights, adverse weather and German opposition. The bomber units involved suffered heavy casualties. Raw made three flights to Warsaw. His bomber was the only aircraft to deliver its cargo to Warsaw during a mission on 16 August; Raw received the Polish Cross of Valour in February 1945 for this achievement. One of his other flights to Warsaw took place on 1 September, but due to bad weather Raw was unable to see the city at the time he dropped the load of supplies.

During a raid on the northern Italian city of Verona on 12 October 1944, Raw's aircraft was hit by two anti-aircraft shells that destroyed its hydraulics system and an engine, wounded the radio operator and opened 166 holes in the fuselage. Despite this damage, Raw was able to return the B-24 safely to its base. He suffered frostbite to his feet, as damage to the plane's nose caused icy winds to enter the cockpit.

In December 1944, Raw was promoted to flight lieutenant. He assumed command of No. 205 Group Communication Squadron in 1945. On 20 February that year, he was awarded the Distinguished Flying Cross for having "completed a notable tour of operational duty" in which he displayed "exceptional skill and devotion to duty" and developed a high-performing aircrew. Raw's brother Norman also served as a RAAF pilot, and was deployed to New Guinea as of February 1945.

Following the end of the war, Raw returned to Australia in November 1945 and was demobilised on 17 January 1946. Two days later he and Dorothy Maggs were married at St Mary's Church of England in Caulfield; they had a daughter.

Raw rejoined the RAAF in May 1946, and retained his wartime rank of flight lieutenant. Between 1947 and October 1949 he was posted to Britain to undertake specialist training in navigation. On his return to Australia, Raw served as an instructor at the RAAF's School of Air Navigation, and later held training positions at No. 78 Wing and No. 2 Operational Training Unit (No. 2 OTU). For a period in 1952 he served as the acting commanding officer of No. 2 OTU, which at the time was training pilots for combat in the Korean War with No. 77 Squadron.

== Commanding officer ==
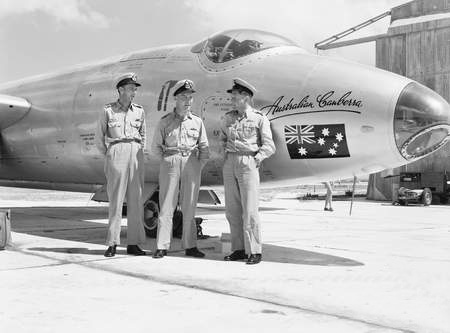
Squadron Leader Peter Raw (centre) and the other two crew members of the Canberra bomber he flew during the 1953 London to Christchurch air race

In January 1953 Raw, who was by now a squadron leader, was appointed the commanding officer of No. 2 Squadron, a heavy bomber unit equipped with Avro Lincolns. On 23 February he also became the initial commander of No. 1 Long Range Flight, which had been formed to participate in the 1953 London to Christchurch air race using two of the RAAF's new English Electric Canberra bombers. He handed this position to Wing Commander Derek Cuming in May, but remained a member of the flight. In July, Raw temporarily vacated his position at No. 2 Squadron so he could focus on preparing for the air race. The Canberras piloted by Raw and Cuming departed Australia for the United Kingdom on 10 September, and the race began on 9 October. Raw's aircraft suffered damage to its nose wheel while landing to refuel at Woomera, South Australia, but was able to be repaired. This accident cost him the lead in the race. Raw arrived at Christchurch at 6:27 am on 10 October, finishing second behind an RAF Canberra piloted by Flight Lieutenant Roland (Monty) Burton.

Raw returned to lead No. 2 Squadron on 18 December 1953. That month, drawing on a nucleus of personnel and aircraft which had served with No. 1 Long Range Flight, the unit became the RAAF's first jet bomber-equipped squadron when its Lincolns were replaced with Canberras. Later in December a Canberra piloted by Raw established a new record for the fastest flight between New Zealand and Australia, completing the crossing between Auckland and Sydney in two hours and 49 minutes. On 31 December, Raw was awarded the Air Force Cross for his role in the London to Christchurch air race; the decoration was presented to him by Queen Elizabeth II at Brisbane on 10 March 1954. A September 1954 story in The Courier-Mail described Raw as a "shy young commander".

After completing his term as commanding officer of No. 2 Squadron on 11 July 1955, Raw was posted to the UK to undertake training at the Royal Air Force Flying College. Upon his return to Australia in January 1956, he was promoted to wing commander and assigned a planning role at RAAF Headquarters in Melbourne. From December that year he was a liaison officer to the RAAF force supporting the British nuclear weapons tests in the Montebello Islands off the coast of Western Australia. Raw was posted to the Joint Planning staff in 1957. In this role, he was part of the Australian delegation to a SEATO military advisers' conference held in Canberra during March 1957. He and Dorothy divorced during 1958, and Raw subsequently married Helen Dorothy Hammond on 21 June that year at St Margaret's Presbyterian Church in Balaclava. This marriage produced another daughter and a son.

In December 1960, Raw joined the directing staff of the RAAF Staff College in Canberra. In 1963 he became the first president of the amateur Canberra Astronomical Society. Later in 1963 he undertook further training at the United States Armed Forces Staff College, after which he became the assistant air attaché in the Australian Embassy in Washington, D.C. In February 1965 Raw assumed command of No. 82 Wing, which controlled all of the RAAF's bomber squadrons. He was raised to acting group captain at this time, and was confirmed in this rank in January the next year.

== Vietnam War ==
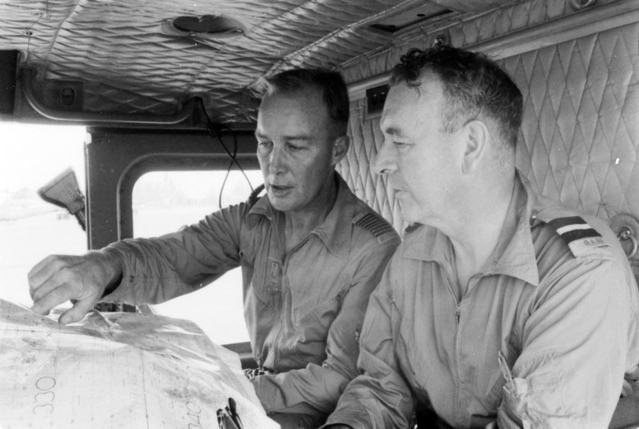
Group Captain Peter Raw (left) with Commander of RAAF Forces Vietnam Air Commodore Jack Dowling in a No. 9 Squadron Iroquois helicopter in 1966

In May 1966, Raw was posted to South Vietnam as the air support commander for the 1st Australian Task Force (1 ATF). This force was composed primarily of Australian Army units, and had recently arrived in the country as part of an expansion of Australia's commitment to the Vietnam War. Although he did not have any background in air/land warfare, Raw's main responsibility in this position was to co-ordinate helicopter support for the Task Force's two infantry battalions.

Raw was given only two weeks to prepare for his new role between handing over command of No. 82 Wing and departing for South Vietnam. During this period he received briefings on the situation in the country and began to familiarise himself with the operations of the RAAF's tactical transport units. Historian Alan Stephens has written that "Group Captain Raw's background as one of the RAAF's most respected bomber leaders was inappropriate for the job of task force air commander: too often he struggled to make the timely decisions demanded by tactical air/land operations". The commander of the RAAF contingent in South Vietnam, Air Commodore Jack Dowling, also lacked expertise in these kinds of operations, and Stephens has argued that the Australian Air Board should have selected officers with more relevant experience.

As air support commander for 1 ATF, Raw came under the direction of its commanding officer, Brigadier David Jackson, for most purposes. Raw was also the commander of the RAAF units stationed at Vũng Tàu and the deputy commander of the RAAF force in South Vietnam. He regularly flew on combat missions with the UH-1 Iroquois helicopter-equipped No. 9 Squadron as well as No. 35 Squadron, which operated DHC-4 Caribou tactical transports.

From the time No. 9 Squadron arrived in South Vietnam during June 1966 there were tensions between the Army and RAAF over how the unit was employed. The squadron's early operations were hindered by rushed preparations, equipment shortages and a directive from the Department of Air that prohibited it from operating in areas where there was a high risk of the helicopters being fired upon. This quickly led to a perception within 1 ATF's headquarters that the squadron was not providing enough support and the RAAF high command had a peacetime mentality. Jackson regarded the RAAF contingent as being slow to respond during operations and was frustrated that it did not always immediately follow his orders. Raw believed that the Task Force headquarters had unrealistic expectations as the Army officers did not understand the difficulty of maintaining and operating helicopters. The two men frequently ended up in heated arguments over the employment of the squadron. At Jackson's request, Raw moved from Vũng Tàu to the Task Force's base at Nui Dat in what proved a successful attempt to improve the relationship between the Army and RAAF. Raw also established an air transport operations centre there.

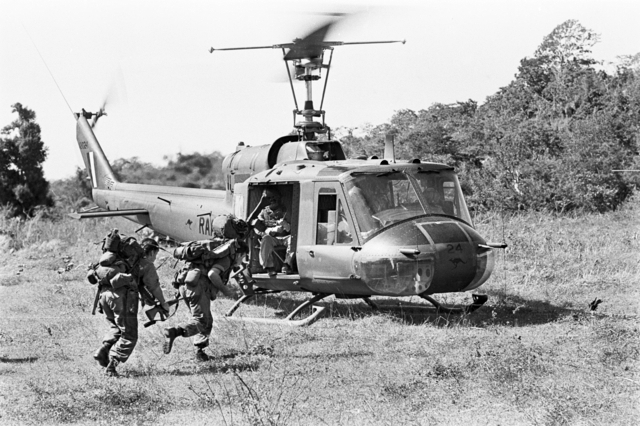
Australian soldiers boarding a No. 9 Squadron Iroquois helicopter in November 1966 during Operation Hayman

Raw's role in the Battle of Long Tan on 18 August 1966 was controversial. During this engagement, D Company of the 6th Battalion, Royal Australian Regiment was nearly surrounded by a much larger force. It requested an urgent resupply of ammunition after running low during heavy fighting. Jackson asked Raw to dispatch two helicopters to transport this ammunition, but Raw initially demurred, concerned that the combination of heavy rain at the time and the intense fighting in the area would make the helicopters easy targets while they hovered to drop ammunition. Sending the helicopters into intense combat would also violate the Department of Air directive that governed how they could be used. Jackson was angered by Raw's response, and argued that the risk of losing a few helicopters was unimportant compared to the possibility of having an infantry company destroyed due to a lack of ammunition and other supplies. He asked his United States Army aviation liaison officer for assistance, who advised that American helicopters could be at Nui Dat within 20 minutes. At around the same time, Raw consulted the four No. 9 Squadron aircrew present at 1 ATF's base on whether the mission was feasible; historian Chris Clark has written that he did so due to his lack of qualifications in helicopter operations. Two of the pilots were in favour of attempting the mission and the others opposed. Raw authorised the resupply flight after the most experienced of the helicopter pilots stated that the mission needed to be flown regardless of risk. The two helicopters successfully dropped supplies to D Company. Five other No. 9 Squadron Iroquois arrived at Nui Dat shortly before the resupply flight began. All seven helicopters conducted a mission later that night to evacuate wounded soldiers, with Raw personally briefing the crews before they departed.

Clark has noted that "while Raw may not have been particularly astute" during the Battle of Long Tan, his experiences in the Warsaw airlift meant that he understood the dangers facing the pilots who were being asked to undertake a dangerous transport flight and that he acted correctly in seeking their views before approving the resupply mission. The volume of The Official History of Australia's Involvement in Southeast Asian Conflicts 1948–1975 covering the Army's role in this period of the Vietnam War and historian David W. Cameron have suggested that Raw authorised the resupply flight after being embarrassed by the willingness of the Americans to conduct the mission.

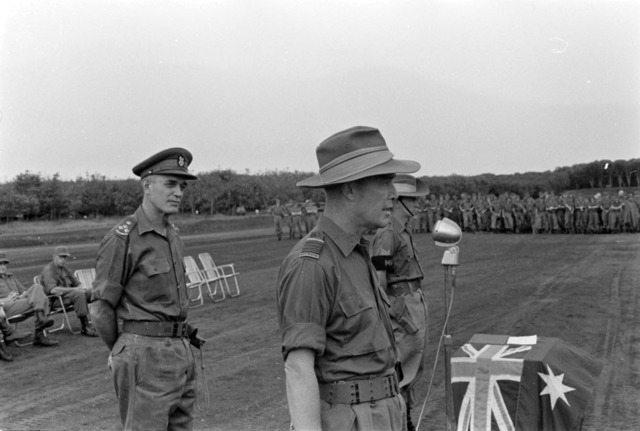
Raw speaking in praise of Brigadier David Jackson during a ceremony in January 1967

As a result of the disagreement during the Battle of Long Tan, the personal relationship between Raw and senior Army commanders in 1 ATF was strained throughout the remainder of his time in South Vietnam. Raw managed to partially improve working relations by educating senior Army officers within the Task Force about the constraints that affected helicopter operations. The bravery and skill demonstrated by the RAAF pilots during the Battle of Long Tan also improved matters. Raw was hit by a stray bullet and slightly wounded while visiting the RAAF Medical Centre at Vũng Tàu in October 1966. In November 1966 he took part in Operation Hayman, which was undertaken by Australian forces against Viet Cong forces on Long Son Island. This was the first large airmobile operation 1 ATF conducted into an area not secured by friendly forces, and Raw flew in with the assault troops and remained on the island to direct air missions, including while under sniper fire. At Jackson's farewell parade in January 1967, Raw praised the Army officer. Jackson subsequently told a seminar that No. 9 Squadron had provided "magnificent" support to his force. Clark has suggested that the two men may have had a good relationship by this time. Raw completed his tour of duty in South Vietnam in April 1967 and returned to Australia. In November that year he was awarded the Distinguished Service Order for his role in the war.

The disagreement between Jackson and Raw during the Battle of Long Tan contributed to inter-service tensions regarding the Australian military's battlefield helicopters. Raw's initial hesitance to commit helicopters reinforced the perception among some Army officers that the RAAF was reluctant to support their service in battle. Some members of the Army also wrongly believed that RAAF pilots had refused to conduct the supply mission, and only did so after the squadron was threatened with being withdrawn from South Vietnam and they were spoken to forcefully by Raw. This perception proved to be long-lasting, and led the Army to advocate for the RAAF's battlefield helicopters to be transferred to its control. This occurred in the late 1980s after the Dibb Report recommended that such a reform would improve the helicopters' combat efficiency.

== Subsequent career ==
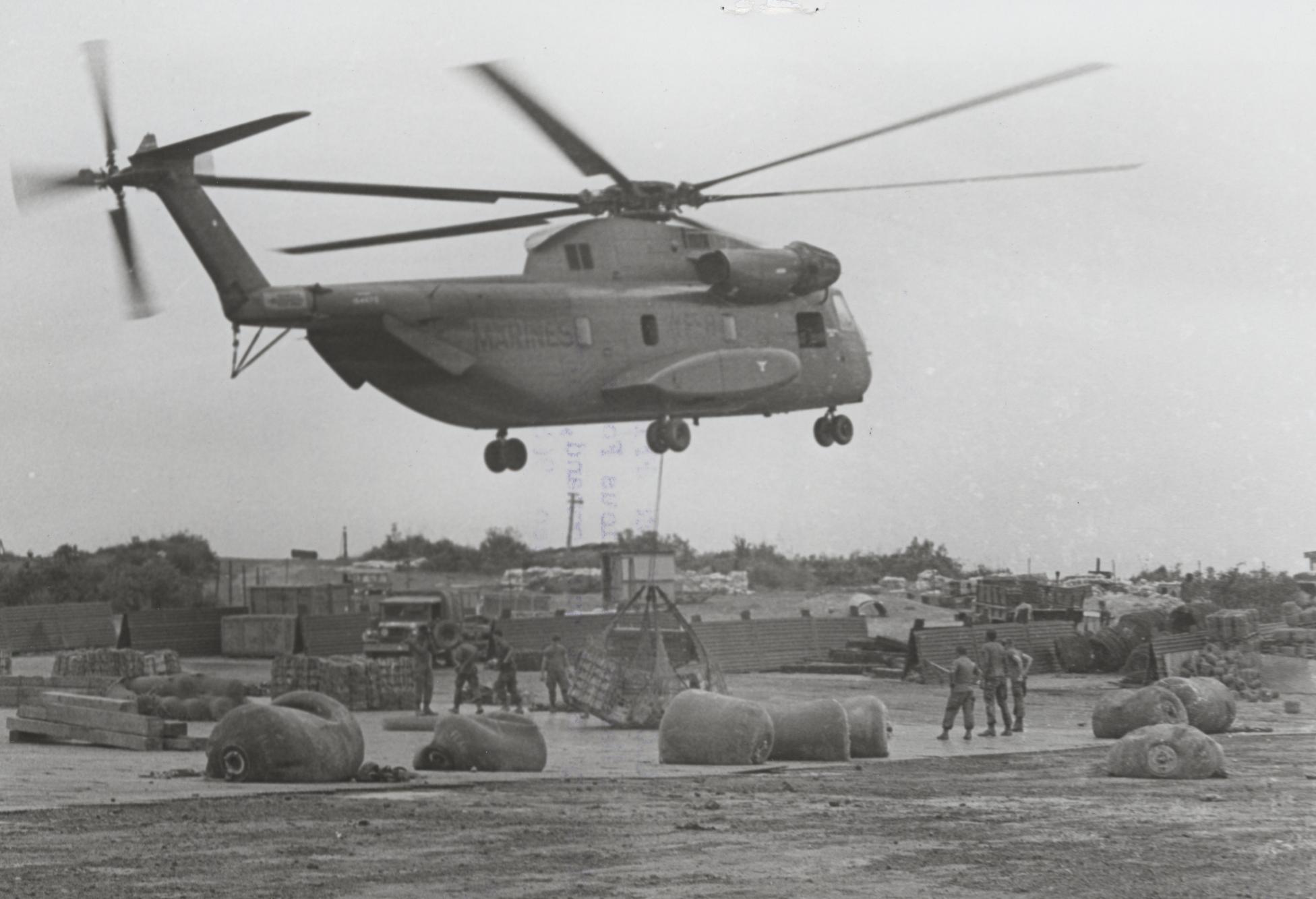
A United States Marine Corps CH-53 Sea Stallion in 1969. Raw's recommendation that the RAAF acquire this type was rejected.

Upon his return to Australia, Raw was appointed Director of Operational Requirements at the Department of Air. In 1969 he headed an evaluation team tasked with selecting a heavy lift helicopter for the RAAF. The team was faced with a choice between the Boeing CH-47 Chinook and Sikorsky CH-53 Sea Stallion, and Raw's final report recommended acquiring CH-53s. CH-47s had previously been judged the most suitable helicopters for Australia's needs by a RAAF team headed by Group Captain Charles Read in 1962, and the Army and RAAF were displeased with Raw's recommendation. The Air Board rejected Raw's report, which it judged "somewhat confusing", and asked Read to also evaluate the two types. Read again recommended in favour of the CH-47 on the grounds that it could carry more cargo and was better suited to operations in Australian-administered Territory of Papua and New Guinea. Twelve of the type were ordered in 1970.

Raw remained the Director of Operational Requirements until 1970, when he became the commandant of the RAAF Staff College. In 1972 he was promoted to air commodore and assumed command of RAAF Base Butterworth in Malaysia. Raw held this position until 1976 when he returned to Australia and became the senior training and staff officer in the headquarters of RAAF Support Command. He received the National Medal in August 1977. Raw retired from the Air Force on 28 February 1978.

In a newspaper interview shortly before his retirement, Raw identified the 1953 London to Christchurch air race as being a highlight of his career. He also observed that RAAF personnel needed higher levels of professional qualifications than had been the case when he joined the Air Force, and there was a greater specialisation in particular fields. Raw said that there was a need to improve the defences of northern Australia on the grounds that "political situations can change overnight".

On 15 July 1988 Raw died of lymphoma at Richmond in Melbourne. He was cremated. Raw was posthumously awarded the Warsaw Uprising Cross by the Polish Government in 1992, and Helen Raw was presented with the medal by the Polish Embassy to Australia.

Raw's obituary in the RAAF News newspaper described him as "one of the RAAF's most highly decorated World War II and post-war pilots". The Australian Dictionary of Biography states he was "considered to be genial, exuberant, popular and efficient" and "proved to be the type of officer who worked best under pressure". Writing in 2007, Chris Clark noted that while Raw's career was "typical of that enjoyed by pilots in the RAAF" during the period in which he served, it was "certainly one of the most colourful personal stories to be found within the service".
