= No. 1 Long Range Flight RAAF =

Temporary Royal Australian Air Force unit

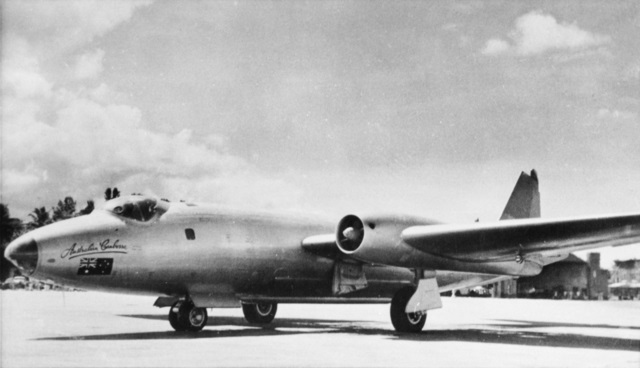
- A No. 1 Long Range Flight Canberra at Ratmalana Airport in Ceylon during the London-to-Christchurch air race
- Active: February–November 1953
- Country: Australia
- Branch: Royal Australian Air Force

Commanders
- Notable commanders: Peter Raw; Derek Cuming

Aircraft flown
- Bomber: Canberra

No. 1 Long Range Flight was a temporary Royal Australian Air Force (RAAF) unit formed to participate in the 1953 London-to-Christchurch air race (also known as the Christchurch or Canterbury centenary air race). The flight was established in February 1953, and was equipped with three Canberra turbojet bombers, specially modified between June and August. Following extensive training, two Canberras departed for the UK in mid-September. The race began on 9 October AEST, (Note: 8 October UK time.) and one of the flight's aircraft placed second, with a total elapsed time of 24 hours and 32 minutes. The other aircraft was forced out of the race when one of its tyres burst while landing at Cocos Island to refuel, but completed its flight to Christchurch after being repaired. After a brief period in New Zealand, both aircraft returned to Australia to be modified back to a standard configuration, and the flight was disbanded in November.

== History ==
=== Training ===
No. 1 Long Range Flight was formed at RAAF Base Laverton, Melbourne, (Note: Not to be confused with Laverton Airport, Western Australia.) on 16 February 1953, to begin preparations for the RAAF's participation in the London-to-Christchurch air race. Squadron Leader Peter Frank Raw became the unit's initial commanding officer on 23 February, and held this position until May, when the more senior Wing Commander Derek R. Cuming assumed command. Cuming had been the first man to fly a jet aircraft in Australia (a Gloster Meteor in 1946), and had previously commanded the RAAF's Aircraft Research and Development Unit (ARDU). In announcing his appointment to command No. 1 Long Range Flight, Minister for Air William McMahon described Cuming as "the RAAF's outstanding test pilot".

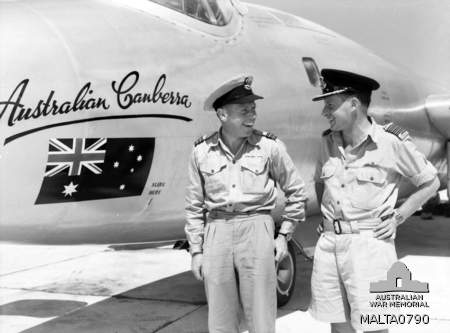
Wing Commander Cuming (at left) with Group Captain Brian Eaton at Malta during Cuming's flight to the UK to take part in the London-to-Christchurch air race

The flight received its first aircraft, the Canberra bomber A84-307, on 15 June 1953. This aircraft had been built in Britain as the RAAF's first Canberra, and was flown to Australia by Wing Commander Cuming in August 1951. The journey had been completed in a flying time of 21 hours and 41 minutes, setting an unofficial record for the route. The flight's second aircraft, A84-201, arrived on 1 July. This was the first Australian-built Canberra and was assigned to No. 1 Long Range Flight shortly after being completed. The second Australian-built Canberra, A84-202, was also assigned to the flight in August. All three aircraft were modified for their specialised role by No. 1 Aircraft Depot. These modifications included fitting distance-measuring equipment in each of the aircraft, and three fuel tanks in their bomb bays. Wing Commander Cuming told journalists in August that the Australian-made Canberras were preferred to the British models on the grounds of national prestige, and because the aircraft were fitted with superior navigation equipment. A84-307 was retained by the flight, however, as the reserve aircraft to be used if modifications to A84-202 were not completed in time for the race.

No. 1 Long Range Flight undertook intensive training in the lead-up to the race. This involved making regular long-range return flights between Laverton and Ceylon, Singapore and Christchurch via various air bases in Australia. These exercises were used to establish fuel consumption rates, and practise the refuelling and navigation techniques that would be used in the race. As part of this training, the flight broke many Australian and New Zealand air speed records, setting the fastest time for crossing the Tasman Sea during a flight between RAAF Base Amberley and Christchurch on 16 August. An aeronautical engineer was attached to No. 1 Long Range Flight from the Department of Air to calculate the optimum route for the Canberras to take. On 2 September Cuming and Raw visited the Government Aircraft Factories facility at Fishermans Bend in Melbourne, to thank the workers who were building Canberra bombers for the RAAF.

=== Race and aftermath ===
Selected as Australia's entries in the London-to-Christchurch air race, A84-201 and A84-202 departed from Laverton bound for the UK on 10 September 1953, and arrived at RAF Lyneham on the 16th of the month. Detachments of No. 1 Long Range Flight ground crew were stationed in the UK, Bahrein, Ratmalana Airport in Ceylon, Cocos Island in the Indian Ocean, and Christchurch. A refuelling crew left Australia for Cocos on 22 August; a skeleton ground crew left for the UK on 9 September. The detachments for Bahrein and Ratmalana Airports left Laverton on board an RAAF Dakota transport aircraft on 25 September. Each of the detachments was led by a ground-based RAAF navigator, whose main role was to develop a flight plan for the next leg of the race, and provide it to the aircrew to minimise the time they spent on the ground. The RAAF also supported its entrants and the aircraft from other countries by deploying an air traffic control team and specialised radar equipment to Christchurch, as well as stationing P-2 Neptune long-range patrol aircraft at Cocos Island, Perth and RAAF Base East Sale for search-and-rescue coverage. The Royal Australian Navy aircraft carrier HMAS Vengeance and destroyer HMAS Bataan were stationed in the Tasman Sea, to provide weather reports for the race.

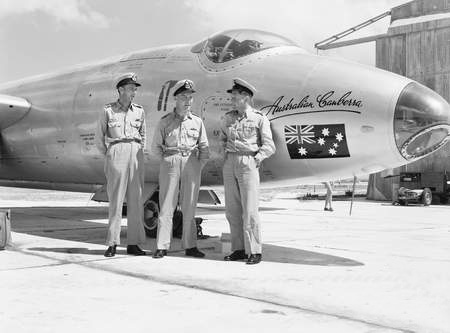
Squadron Leader Raw (centre) and his crew with A84-201 at Malta, on their way to London for the race

The London-to-Christchurch air race began on 9 October AEST (Note: Time in Australia = GMT + 8:00 (western), 9:30 (central), or 10:00 (eastern); time in New Zealand = GMT + 12:00; neither country used daylight saving time then. In the UK, British Summer Time ended on 4 October 1953.) at London Airport. First, three transport planes took off in the Handicap Section of the race. About an hour later, it was the turn of the Speed Section. The three Royal Air Force (RAF) Canberras left at five-minute intervals. Then A84-202 (race number "4") took off at 03:50 AEST, (Note: 17:50 on 8 October GMT.) piloted by Wing Commander Cuming, with co-pilot Flying Officer R.J. Atkinson and navigator Squadron Leader Colin G. Harvey. Then A84-201 (race number "5") followed, piloted by Squadron Leader Raw, with co-pilot Flying Officer (Francis) Noel Davis and navigator Flight Lieutenant William D. "Bill" Kerr.

The aircraft flew separately at 40,000 ft (12,000 m) to Bahrein and Ratmalana Airports, where they made brief refuelling stops. On the way to Cocos, turbulence stopped one of A84-202's engines, forcing it to descend to get it restarted. One of A84-202's tyres burst while landing at Cocos Island, putting it out of the race. At this time, A84-202 was three minutes ahead of A84-201 and 25 minutes ahead of two of the entrants from the RAF (the third one flew past Cocos without landing).

After refuelling at Cocos, A84-201 next landed at RAAF Woomera Airfield in South Australia to refuel. Unfortunately, ice accretion prevented the nose wheel lowering properly. This caused the plane to slide along on its nose, creating a large hole in the fuselage and destroying the pitot tube, which measured airspeed. After emergency repairs, the aircraft took off at 00:24 AEST. (Note: 14:24 GMT.) The repairs had delayed the aircraft by about a further 73 minutes, however. (Note: 14:24 GMT − 12:58 GMT − 00:13 average RAAF refuel time = 01:13 delay.) Approaching Christchurch in low cloud, the crew found that, because of the damage, the ground staff could not hear the aircraft's radio, although they could hear the ground staff.

A84-201 arrived at Harewood Airport in Christchurch at 04:27 AEST, (Note: 06:27 local time, 18:27 GMT.) and placed second in the race, with an elapsed time of 24:32, and a flying time of 22:27. The winning aircraft, RAF Canberra WE139, piloted by Flight Lieutenant Monty Burton, finished with an elapsed time of 23:52, and a flying time of 22:29. The £3,000 prize money awarded to Raw for placing second was later donated to the RAAF Welfare Trust Fund.

On 10 October two replacement tyres were flown to Cocos Island to repair A84-202. The aircraft departed on the 12th of the month (AEST) and flew to Christchurch via Laverton; its total flying time was 22 hours and 23.5 minutes. Cuming later told journalists that A84-202's crew had drunk beer and gone for a swim while waiting 55 hours for their aircraft to be repaired. Both Canberras later flew demonstration flights over Harewood Airport and RNZAF Base Whenuapai, and returned to Laverton on 19 October. The aircraft were transferred to No. 1 Aircraft Depot on 2 November to be returned to standard configuration, and No. 1 Long Range Flight's overseas detachments had all returned to Australia by 6 November. The flight was disbanded on the 16th of the month. The total cost of the RAAF's entry in the air race was £50,000, which Minister McMahon claimed was a "bargain rate", given the results of the air force's participation.

After No. 1 Long Range Flight was disbanded, Wing Commander Cuming returned to the ARDU. He was subsequently appointed an Officer of the Order of the British Empire (OBE) on 31 December 1953 for leading the flight and participating in the London-to-Christchurch air race. Squadron Leader Raw was awarded the Air Force Cross for his role in the race, the decoration being presented to him by Queen Elizabeth II at Brisbane on 10 March 1954. Raw had assumed command of No. 2 Squadron on 18 December; this was the first RAAF jet bomber squadron. Flight Lieutenant Francis Noel Davis, who had been Raw's co-pilot during the race, and two other airmen were killed on 16 June 1954 when A84-202 crashed near Amberley. Wing Commander Cuming presided over the four-man court of inquiry which investigated the cause of this accident. As of May 2011, A84-201 was a gate guard at RAAF Base Amberley.
