= Spud =

Spud is a common nickname for the potato.

Spud(s) may also refer to:

== People ==
- Spud (nickname), a list of people nicknamed "Spud" or "Spuds"
- Spud Murphy (1908–2005), American jazz musician, bandleader and arranger Lyle Stephanovic
- Rockstar Spud (or Spud), ring name of British professional wrestler James Michael Curtin (born 1983), otherwise known as Drake Maverick
- Surfer Spud, former Operations Director at Live 105 and current vocalist/keyboardist for surf pop band Drifting Sand
- Joe "Spud" Murphy, founder of the potato chips company Tayto (Republic of Ireland)

== Arts and entertainment ==
=== Characters ===
- Fred "Spud" Baker, in the British sitcom Cradle to Grave
- Spuds MacKenzie, a canine mascot in an advertising campaign for Bud Light beer
- Daniel "Spud" Murphy, in the 1993 novel Trainspotting and the 1996 film adaptation
- Arthur "Spud" P. Spudinski, in American Dragon: Jake Long
- Laurie "Spud" Odell, in Mary Renault's 1953 novel The Charioteer
- Spud the Scarecrow, in Bob the Builder
- Spud, in the Australian comic strip Beyond the Black Stump
- Spud, in The Ridonculous Race

=== Other ===
- Spud (game), a children's game
- Spud (novel), a 2005 novel by John Howard van de Ruit
  - Spud (film), a 2010 adaptation of the novel
- Spuds (film), a 1927 American silent comedy film

== Acronym ==
- Saint Paul Union Depot, a railroad station and transit hub in Saint Paul, Minnesota
- St. Paul University Dumaguete, Dumaguete City, Philippines, a private Catholic university
- Sustainable Produce Urban Delivery, a Canadian online grocery service

== Other uses ==
- Spuds, a derogatory slur for Tottenham Hotspur F.C. English football club and their supporters
- Spuds, Florida, United States, an unincorporated community
- Spud Drive-In Theater, near Driggs, Idaho, United States, on the National Register of Historic Places
- Bark spud (tool), a hand tool used for removing bark from logs
- CJRW-FM (102 Spud FM), a Canadian radio station broadcasting in Summerside, Prince Edward Island
- Spud, one of the Operation Bowline United States nuclear test series, detonated in July 1968
- Spud, steel pile that can be lowered to penetrate the bottom to hold a spud barge in position, often deployed at each corner of the barge. Also used to position a dredge - see Dredging#Grab dredgers
- GPT-5.5 (codename "Spud"), a large-language model
- SpudBros, a British food truck that primarily serves baked potatoes

== See also ==
- Idaho Spud, a candy bar
- Spud bar, a hand tool designed to deliver blows to a target
- Spud One, a Boeing 727 used by Jim Bolger
