= No. 5 Group RAAF =

No. 5 (Maintenance) Group RAAF
- Active: 1942–1946
- Country: Australia
- Branch: Royal Australian Air Force
- Headquarters: Sydney

Commanders
- Notable commanders: D.E.L. Wilson

No. 5 (Maintenance) Group RAAF was a Royal Australian Air Force (RAAF) group of World War II. It was formed in June 1942 as part of a reorganisation of the air force that saw maintenance functions transferred from area commands to dedicated functional groups. No. 5 (Maintenance) Group was disbanded following the war in January 1946.

== History ==
On 23 May 1942, Australian Prime Minister John Curtin agreed to a proposal made by Air Vice-Marshal George Jones, the RAAF Chief of the Air Staff, to establish up to five maintenance groups as part of a broader reorganisation of the air force along semi-functional, semi-geographical lines. These groups were to be tasked with supporting the RAAF's five operational area commands.

No. 5 (Maintenance) Group was the first of these groups to be established, and was formed on 1 June 1942. Its inaugural commanding officer was Group Captain D.E.L. Wilson, and the group's headquarters was located in the Sydney suburb of Darling Point. In the event, the only other maintenance group to be formed was No. 4, which was established on 14 September 1942. No. 5 Group was responsible for administering the RAAF maintenance units located in the Australian states of New South Wales and Queensland, as well as the city of Noumea in New Caledonia. As of early 1943, the group reported directly to RAAF Headquarters.

Following the end of the war, No. 5 Group was disbanded at Sydney on 13 January 1946.
