= Spud (nickname) =

Spud or Spuds is a nickname for:

== Spud ==
- Simon 'Spud' Beggs, former guitarist in the American rock hybrid band Mondo Generator, session guitar for Robin Gibb
- Jim Bolger (born 1935), former Prime Minister of New Zealand
- Mark Carroll (rugby league) (born 1967), Australian rugby league player
- Spud Chandler (1907–1990), American baseball player
- Spud Clements (1928–1992), American politician
- Spud Davis (1904–1984), American Major League Baseball catcher, coach, scout and manager
- George Raymond Eisele (1923–1942), United States Navy sailor killed in World War II
- Michael Firrito (born 1983), Australian rules footballer
- Danny Frawley (1963–2019), Australian rules footballer and coach
- Spud Harder (1906–1994), American college football player, college football and baseball coach and college athletic director
- Spud Johnson (1856-1928), American Major League Baseball player
- Howie Krist (1916-1989), American Major League Baseball pitcher
- John McConnell (actor) (born 1958), American actor and radio personality
- Arthur Melin, co-founder of the Wham-O toy company and co-inventor of the modern hula hoop
- Sadao Munemori (1922–1945), United States Army soldier posthumously awarded the Medal of Honor
- Arthur William Murphy (1891-1963), Royal Australian Air Force aviator and temporary air commodore
- Peter Murphy (footballer, born 1922) (1922-1975), English footballer
- Peter Dutton (born 1970), Australian politician
- Spud Owen, head football coach for the Eureka College Red Devils (1953-1955)
- Spud Webb (born 1963), American basketball player
- Daniel "Spud" Murphy, character of the 1993 novel Trainspotting and the 1996 film adaptation

== Spuds ==
- Theodore G. Ellyson (1885-1928), first United States Navy aviator
- Andy Hebenton (1929–2019), Canadian National Hockey League player

== Other ==
- Spuddz (born 1994), English comedian and internet personality
