= Arthur William Murphy =

Australian engineer and aviator (1891–1963)

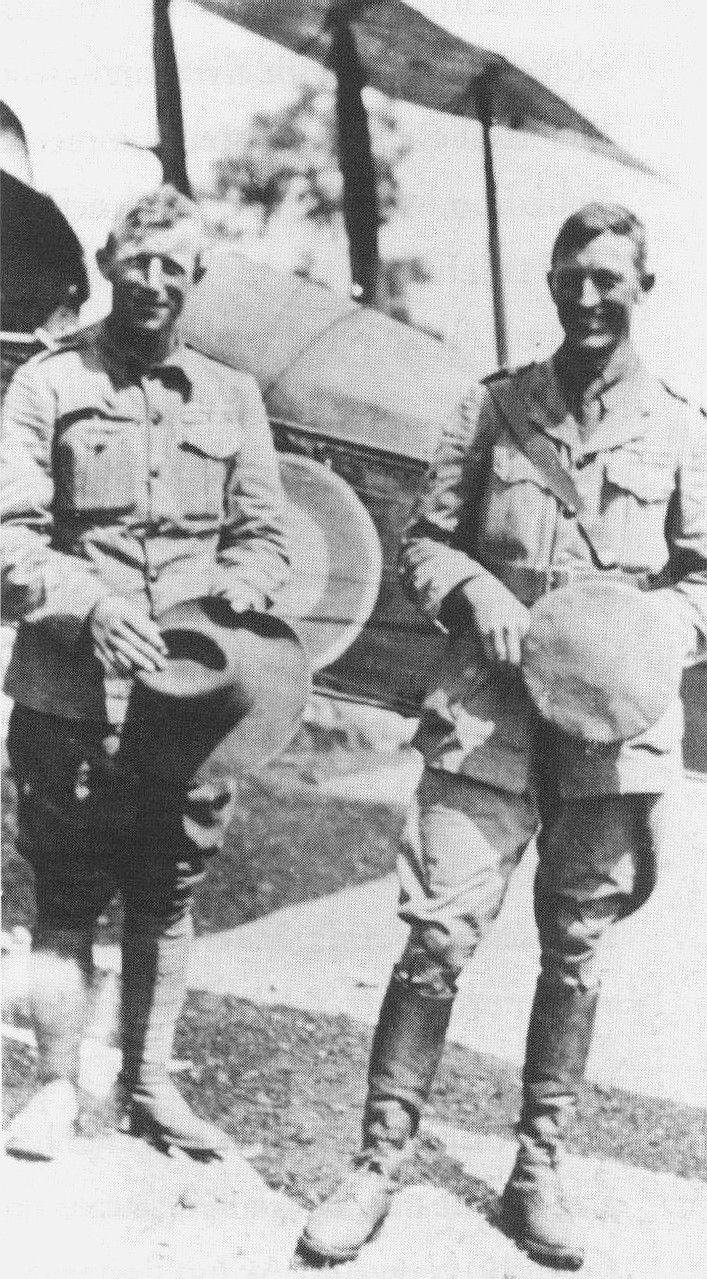
- Sergeant Murphy (left) and Captain Wrigley during their pioneering trans-Australia flight, 1919
- Born: 17 November 1891; Kew, Victoria
- Died: 21 April 1963 (aged 71); Essendon, Victoria
- Military career
- Allegiance: Australia
- Service/branch: Royal Australian Air Force
- Service years: 1914–46
- Rank: Air Commodore
- Nickname: "Spud"
- Units: No. 1 Squadron AFC (1916–18); No. 3 Squadron (1925–26)
- Commands: No. 1 Aircraft Depot (1938–40); No. 4 Maintenance Group (1942–45)
- Conflicts: World War I; Middle Eastern theatre; Sinai and Palestine campaign; World War II
- Awards: Distinguished Flying Cross; Air Force Cross; Mentioned in Despatches

Air Commodore Arthur William Murphy, DFC, AFC, FRAeS (17 November 1891 – 21 April 1963) was a senior engineer and aviator in the Royal Australian Air Force (RAAF). He accompanied Henry Wrigley on the first trans-Australia flight from Melbourne to Darwin in 1919, a feat that earned both men the Air Force Cross. Murphy later played a leading role in military aircraft maintenance and production.

A veteran of World War I, Murphy served first as a mechanic and then as a pilot with the Australian Flying Corps. Based in the Middle East, he flew with No. 1 Squadron and was awarded the Distinguished Flying Cross. Murphy was the first airman on the RAAF's strength when it formed in 1921, and rose to the rank of temporary air commodore during World War II, commanding No. 1 Aircraft Depot and, later, No. 4 Maintenance Group. He was also the RAAF's first Inspector of Air Accidents. A fellow of the Royal Aeronautical Society, Murphy retired from the military in 1946, and died in 1963 aged seventy-one.

== Early life and World War I ==
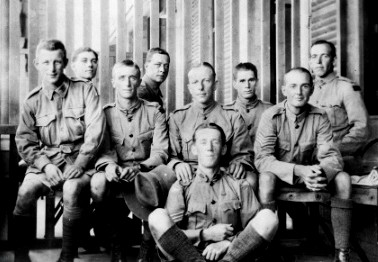
Lieutenant Murphy (far left) with fellow Australian Flying Corps pilots, Middle East, 1918

Murphy was born 17 November 1891 in Kew, a suburb of Melbourne, to joiner and engineer Charles Hubert Murphy and his wife Mary. Educated at Melbourne High School and Footscray Technical School, he spent five years with Austral Otis Engineering as an apprentice. Having been employed at various engineering firms, Murphy joined the Australian Army's Aviation Instructional Staff at Central Flying School Point Cook in 1914 to train as an air mechanic. By February 1916, he had risen to the rank of sergeant and volunteered for the Australian Imperial Force to serve overseas. Transferring to the Australian Flying Corps, Murphy was allocated to No. 1 Squadron—also known until 1918 as No. 67 Squadron, Royal Flying Corps (RFC)—as a warrant officer. He departed Melbourne aboard HMAT A67 Orsova on 16 March, bound for Egypt.

Based in the Sinai Desert and Palestine, Murphy was initially responsible for No. 1 Squadron aircraft maintenance; his achievements saw him mentioned in despatches in 1917. He then trained as a pilot with the RFC in Egypt, and obtained a temporary commission as a second lieutenant on 24 October. Murphy flew with the RFC before returning to No. 1 Squadron in Palestine. During 1918, he piloted Bristol Fighters in combat over Jordan. On 12 August, he and his observer were selected to join Colonel T. E. Lawrence and his irregular Arab army in the Hejaz near Daraa, providing air cover and reconnaissance. Credited with bringing down two enemy aircraft while supporting Lawrence's troops, Murphy was awarded the Distinguished Flying Cross for his "keenness, reliability and boldness".

== Between the wars ==
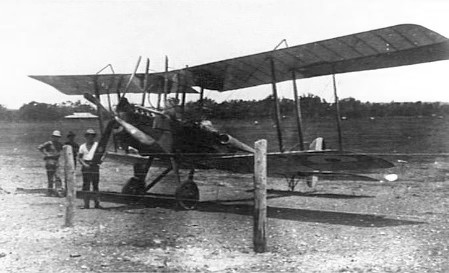
B.E.2 flown by Murphy and Wrigley on their pioneering journey across Australia in 1919

Murphy's temporary commission was terminated after the war and he reverted to the rank of sergeant to remain in the Army, returning to Australia on 5 March 1919. Later that year he took part in the first transcontinental flight across Australia, from Melbourne to Darwin, Northern Territory, accompanying pilot and former schoolmate, Captain Henry Wrigley. The pair departed Point Cook on 16 November and arrived in Darwin on 12 December, having travelled 4,500 kilometres (2,800 mi) in forty-seven flying hours. They flew in a single-engined Royal Aircraft Factory B.E.2 with no radio, over unmapped and often hazardous terrain, and surveyed seventeen potential landing grounds along the journey. Murphy and Wrigley were each awarded the Air Force Cross in recognition of their achievement. Such was the perceived danger of the expedition that while making preparations for the return flight they received a telegram from the Defence Department ordering them to desist, arrange for the B.E.2 to be dismantled and shipped back, and themselves to travel southwards by steamer.

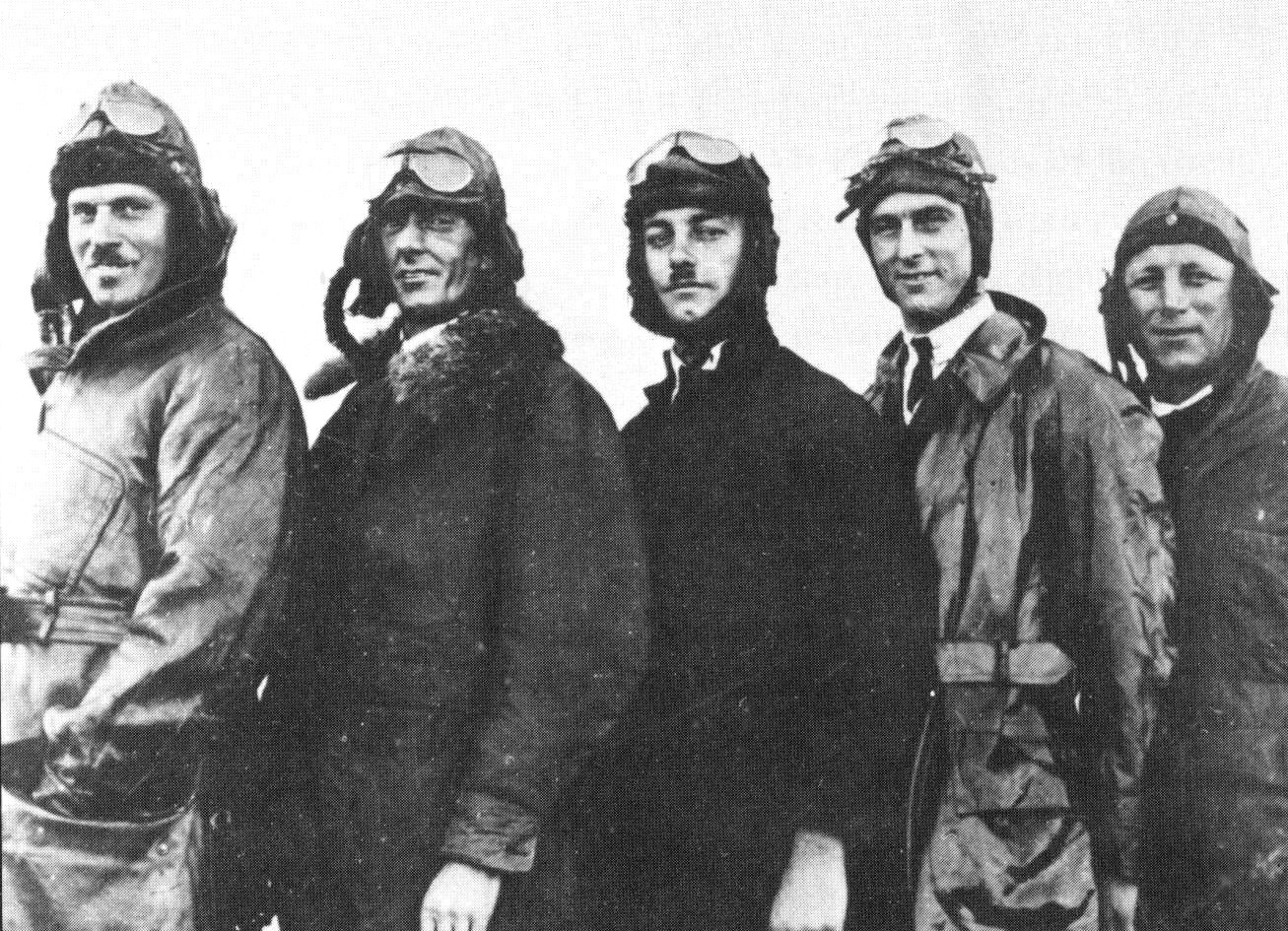
Flying Officer Murphy (far right) with members of No. 3 Squadron, RAAF Richmond, 1925

Following disbandment of the wartime AFC, Murphy transferred to its successor, the Australian Air Corps, on 1 January 1920. On 31 March 1921, he joined the newly established Royal Australian Air Force (RAAF) as its first airman, literally "Airman No. 1" according to his papers. Nicknamed "Spud", and described as "immensely capable and popular", he was commissioned as a flying officer in September that year. Murphy married Alicia Shoebridge at Erskine Presbyterian Church in South Carlton, Melbourne, on 17 October 1922; the couple had two sons and a daughter. In July 1925, he was one of the founding pilots of the newly reformed No. 3 Squadron under Flight Lieutenant Frank Lukis, when it became the first flying unit to be based at the recently opened RAAF Station Richmond, New South Wales. Promoted to flight lieutenant, Murphy was posted to the RAAF Experimental Section under Wing Commander (later Sir) Lawrence Wackett in November 1926. The following year he took part in a round-Australia survey flight under the command of the Chief of the Air Staff, Wing Commander (later Air Marshal Sir) Richard Williams.

Raised to squadron leader, Murphy was given temporary command of No. 1 Aircraft Depot at RAAF Station Laverton, Victoria, in the opening months of 1933. He subsequently took charge of the unit's workshops. Towards the end of 1935, he was responsible for specially modifying a Westland Wapiti and a de Havilland Gipsy Moth for Antarctic conditions, to enable an Air Force team led by Flight Lieutenant (later Group Captain) Eric Douglas and Flying Officer (later Air Marshal Sir) Alister Murdoch to rescue explorer Lincoln Ellsworth, who was presumed lost on a journey across the continent. In 1936, Murphy was selected to join Wackett on a mission to investigate aircraft production overseas with a view to setting up local construction plants. The team determined that the North American NA-16 was most suitable for Australian conditions and manufacture; following testing of a prototype, designated the NA-33, the design went into production in January 1939 as the CAC Wirraway. Murphy was promoted to wing commander in November 1936 and appointed commanding officer of No. 1 Aircraft Depot in January 1938.

== World War II and retirement ==
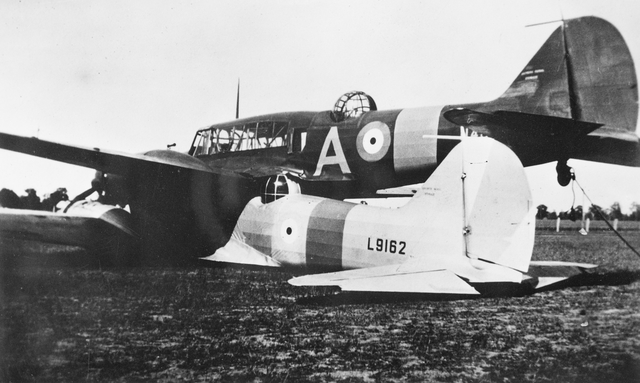
Aftermath of the Brocklesby mid-air collision that Murphy investigated as RAAF Inspector of Air Accidents in September 1940

Murphy continued to play a leading role in aircraft maintenance and production during World War II. In 1939 he helped set up the Government Aircraft Factories and local manufacture of the Bristol Beaufort torpedo bomber. Completing his term as commanding officer of No. 1 Aircraft Depot, he was promoted to group captain and appointed Inspector of Air Accidents in June 1940. The newly created position reported directly to the Chief of the Air Staff. Murphy's deputy was Flying Officer (later Sir) Henry Winneke, who found his boss's companionship "exhilarating". Murphy was, according to Winneke, "a product of the old school of airmen who could not only fly a plane but also pull it apart and put it together again", generally "amiable" but who "could act gruffly when the occasion demanded". The inspectorate was small but succeeded in reducing the number of accidents even as training expanded rapidly with Australia's participation in the Empire Air Training Scheme. Murphy led the investigation into the Canberra air disaster of August 1940, and the Brocklesby mid-air collision that occurred the following month.

The RAAF formed No. 4 Maintenance Group in September 1942 to co-ordinate the efforts of maintenance units in Victoria, South Australia and Tasmania. Murphy was appointed its commander, and held the post until the end of the war. He was promoted to temporary air commodore in July 1943. By 1945, he had passed the statutory retirement age for his substantive rank of wing commander, and was summarily retired from the RAAF along with several other senior staff and veterans of World War I including Wrigley and Williams, to make way for the advancement of younger and equally capable officers. Discharged from the Air Force on 10 January 1946, Murphy was later elected a fellow of the Royal Aeronautical Society. He died of heart disease in Essendon, Melbourne, on 21 April 1963 aged seventy-one. Survived by his children, Murphy was cremated at Fawkner, Victoria.
