= Alfred George Pither =

- Born: 16 October 1908; Shepparton, Victoria, Australia
- Died: 2 July 1971 (aged 62) Hawthorn, Victoria, Australia
- Allegiance: Australia
- Branch: Royal Australian Air Force
- Service years: 1927–1966
- Rank: Air Commodore
- Service number: O323
- Commands: No. 1 Aircraft Depot RAAF
- Conflicts: Second World War; New Guinea campaign; North-West Europe Campaign of 1944–45; Occupation of Japan
- Awards: Commander of the Order of the British Empire

Air Commodore Alfred George Pither, CBE (16 October 1908 – 2 July 1971) was a Royal Australian Air Force officer. During the Second World War he established a chain of long-range radar stations throughout Australia and the South West Pacific. After the war, he helped in planning the Long Range Weapons Establishment, which he named Woomera.

== Early life ==
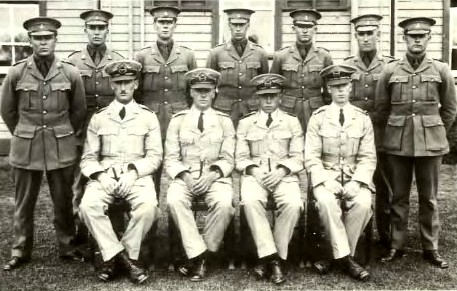
Flight training course in December 1930. Pither is seated, second from the left

Alfred George Pither was born in Shepparton, Victoria, on 16 October 1908, the oldest of the six children of James Luke Pither, a farmer, and his wife Rosanna Amelia née Fletcher. He was educated at Pine Lodge Primary School and Shepparton High School, from which he obtained his leaving certificate. He served in the Australian Army Cadets from 1 July 1925 to 28 October 1926, reaching the rank of corporal. He entered the Royal Military College, Duntroon, on 16 February 1927.

On graduation from Duntroon on 9 December 1930, Pither was commissioned as a lieutenant in the Australian Army, but the following day became a pilot officer in the Royal Australian Air Force (RAAF) with the service number O323. After completing No. 10 Flying Training Course, and parachute and signals training, he joined No. 1 Squadron RAAF. He was promoted to flying officer on 1 July 1932. He was admitted to Caulfield Military Hospital on 19 December 1932 with appendicitis, but the operation was botched. A swab was left in his stomach, resulting in infection. He was readmitted, and a kidney had to be removed.

Temporarily rendered unfit for flying duties, Pither pursued his interest in signals. He sailed for the UK on the RMS Mooltan in March 1936, and attended the Royal Air Force (RAF) Long Signals Course at RAF Cranwell. While there, he was promoted to flight lieutenant on 1 April 1936. On returning to Australia he was given command of the RAAF Signals Training School at RAAF Laverton. He reorganised it, and arranged for it to move to a new permanent home at nearby RAAF Point Cook. He was promoted to the temporary rank of squadron leader on 1 September 1939.

== Second World War ==
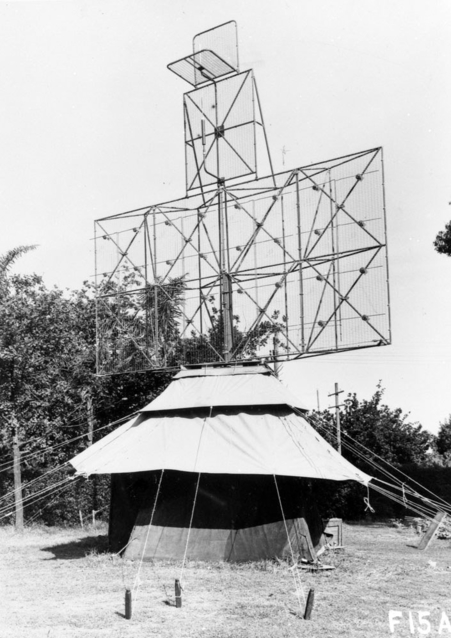
Mark 1A Light Weight Air Warning (LW/AW) Radar. The canvas tent enclosure and flies are in position, surrounding the A frame of the radar. On top of the AW Array is the Interrogator Array and above that the Responser Array.

On 23 October 1939, shortly after the outbreak of Second World War, Pither was posted to the staff of RAAF Headquarters, where he developed the signals training regimen for the Empire Air Training Scheme, introducing a new curriculum for Wireless Mechanics and Signals training at Point Cook. In September 1940, he was sent to the UK for a training course on radar, then a new and secret development. Promoted to temporary wing commander on 1 January 1941, he returned to Australia by way of the United States and Canada, where he studied the latest developments. While he was in Canada, he married a Sydney-born woman, Lillian Ruth Ball, at Christ Church Cathedral in Vancouver on 13 April 1941.

Returning to Australia in May 1941, Pither became the head of Section S7 of the RAAF Directorate of Signals, which was responsible for radar. He established a new school, No. 1 Radio School (later renamed No. 1 Radar School) to train specialists in the operation and maintenance of radar sets. The school officially opened on 4 August 1941, although 23 mechanics had already commenced the first course on 29 July. The course was based on the ASV Mk. I radar set, the only model available in Australia at the time. Later in the year, an RAF officer and three NCOs, with a Chain Home Low set made it possible to also give courses in ground-based radar. On 7 November 1941, the War Cabinet ordered that a series of early warning radar installations be established across northern Australia.

Pither, whose S7 Section became the RAAF Directorate of Radar in January 1942, found himself engaged in a desperate race against time after Japan entered the war, and Japanese aircraft soon began appearing over Australia. The only unit under his control was No. 1 Radar School, but he liaised with the Allied Works Council, RAAF airfield construction squadrons and local government bodies, to prepare the required radar installations. He worked closely with the Radio Physics Laboratory (RPL) of the Council for Scientific and Industrial Research (CSIR), which developed radar technology, with the New South Wales Government Railways Workshop, Postmaster-General's Department (PMG), Gramophone Company (His Master's Voice) and AWA that built the radar sets, and with the University of Sydney and the Melbourne Technical College that helped train his radar officers and mechanics, respectively. The Australian Light Weight Air Warning Radar (LW/AW) radar was a success, and was used by the British and American forces as well. By the end of 1942, 136 officers, 500 mechanics and 1,000 operators had been trained, 100 aircraft had been fitted with radar sets and 57 radar stations were operational.

This was not accomplished without cutting red tape and treading on toes. In October 1943. Pither was sent to the UK on exchange. There he worked on the radar arrangements for Operation Overlord. In July 1944 he joined No. 80 Wing RAF. He was placed in command of a radio-jamming unit in southern England that was specifically established to jam the electronic guidance systems of German V-2 rockets. His unit followed in the wake of the allied advance into Belgium, continuing its campaign against the V-2 rockets. He returned to Australia in December 1944, and became head of the Directorate of Radar once more, but the crisis had passed and there was little to do.

== Post-war ==
In October 1945, the wake of the surrender of Japan, Pither headed a three-man team sent to Japan to study the country's scientific achievements. This was concluded in February 1946, and he left for England, where he was the RAAF delegate at the Commonwealth Defence Science Conference in May 1946. In July, he was appointed to the Air Board as Air Member for Technical Services, with special responsibility for guided missiles. Promoted to temporary group captain on 1 March 1947, he became the RAAF Liaison Officer at the new Long Range Weapons Establishment, for which he proposed the name "Woomera", a proposal that was soon approved. In May 1951, he was seconded to the Department of Supply as the Range Officer at Woomera. He was involved in the testing of guided missiles, and in the British Operation Totem nuclear tests at Emu Field in South Australia in 1953.

Pither returned to duty with the RAAF on 14 July 1954, and became Director of Telecommunications and Radar on 20 September 1954. He was appointed a Commander of the Order of the British Empire in the 1956 New Year Honours. On 2 June 1959, he assumed command of No. 1 Aircraft Depot RAAF. He took charge of RAAF Laverton on 21 June 1961. On 29 January 1963 he became staff officer for telecommunication engineering at Headquarters RAAF Support Command in Melbourne. His first wife died in 1964. On 18 December 1964, he married Ethel Constance Jones née Wilton at the Methodist Church in Camberwell, Victoria. He retired on 16 February 1966 with the honorary rank of air commodore.

In retirement, Pither served as treasurer and councillor of the state branch of the Royal Flying Doctor Service. He died suddenly on 2 July 1971 in Hawthorn, Victoria, from a coronary infarction, and his remains were cremated. He was survived by his wife and the twin son and daughter from his first marriage.

== Honours and awards ==
- 2 January 1956 Pither was appointed a Commander of the Order of the British Empire in the 1956 New Year Honours
