= John Lerew =

Royal Australian Air Force officer

John Margrave Lerew
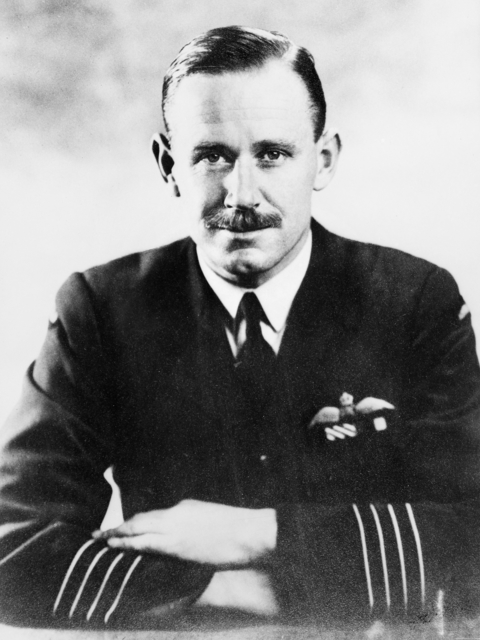
- Group Captain John Lerew
- Born: 20 August 1912; Hamilton, Victoria
- Died: 24 February 1996 (aged 83); Vancouver, British Columbia
- Military career
- Allegiance: Australia
- Branch: Royal Australian Air Force
- Service years: 1932–46
- Rank: Group Captain
- Commands: No. 24 Squadron (1941–42); No. 32 Squadron (1942); RAAF Station Townsville (1942); No. 7 Squadron (1942); No. 1 Aircraft Depot (1942–43); Flying Safety Directorate (1945–46)
- Conflicts: World War II; South West Pacific theatre; New Guinea campaign; Battle of Rabaul
- Awards: Distinguished Flying Cross
- Other work: Section Chief, ICAO (1946–72)

John Margrave Lerew, DFC (20 August 1912 – 24 February 1996) was an officer and pilot in the Royal Australian Air Force (RAAF) during World War II, and later a senior manager in the International Civil Aviation Organization (ICAO). As commander of No. 24 Squadron, based in New Britain, he became famous in the annals of Air Force history for his irreverent response to orders by headquarters in Australia during the Battle of Rabaul in January 1942. After his squadron was directed to assist in repelling the invading Japanese fleet with its one serviceable bomber, and to keep its damaged airfield open, Lerew signalled headquarters with the ancient Latin phrase supposedly used by gladiators honouring their Emperor: "Morituri vos salutamus" ("We who are about to die salute you"). He also defied an order to abandon his staff, and organised their escape from Rabaul.

In February 1942, Lerew led a low-level bombing raid on enemy shipping in New Guinea that set two vessels on fire. He was shot down but managed to evade capture, and returned to safety nine days after being reported missing. Awarded the Distinguished Flying Cross, he subsequently commanded the RAAF's first flying safety directorate. After leaving the Air Force in 1946 as a group captain, Lerew took up a position with the newly formed ICAO in Canada. He was responsible for several of its administrative and technical reforms, and rose to Chief of Flight Branch in 1969. Retiring from ICAO in 1972, he travelled extensively before settling in Vancouver, where he died in 1996 at the age of eighty-three.

== Early life ==
Born in Hamilton, Victoria, Lerew was the son of William Margrave Lerew, a chemist and veterinary surgeon who had emigrated from England with his two brothers. The family was of French Huguenot extraction, the original name being Le Roux. John Lerew was educated at Scotch College, Melbourne, where he was a member of the cadets. He studied part-time for a bachelor's degree in civil engineering at the University of Melbourne, concurrently serving approximately two years in the militia with several units including the 39th Battalion, 3rd Division Artillery Survey Unit, and Melbourne University Regiment. He also developed a love of fast cars, joining a racing team and placing third in the 1930 Australian Grand Prix.

On 19 November 1932, Lerew enlisted as an air cadet in the RAAF active reserve, known as the Citizen Air Force (CAF). He had marched into Victoria Barracks on a whim and asked to see the person in charge of Air Force recruiting. He was shown to the office of Squadron Leader Raymond Brownell, also a former Scotch College boy, who admitted him. Lerew undertook flying instruction on the 1933 'B' course conducted by No. 1 Squadron at RAAF Station Laverton, and was commissioned a pilot officer on 1 April. He transferred from the CAF to the Permanent Air Force on 20 May 1935, following graduation from university, and was promoted flying officer on 1 July. Posted to No. 1 Aircraft Depot, he was raised to probationary flight lieutenant in 1936. The rank became substantive the following year, when he was appointed Staff Officer Directorate of Works and Buildings at RAAF Headquarters, Melbourne, responsible for selection and improvement of airfield sites.

== World War II ==
Lerew was still based in Melbourne when World War II broke out in September 1939. He was promoted squadron leader in June 1940, and the same month took charge of No. 1 Aircraft Park in Geelong. One of his initial tasks was to test fly the first Fairey Battle single-engined light bomber assembled in Australia. He was posted to No. 2 Aircraft Depot at RAAF Station Richmond, New South Wales, in September 1940, and shortly afterwards undertook a survey of the Solomon Islands and the island of New Britain, including its capital Rabaul. Lerew was given command of No. 24 Squadron in May 1941, and raised to temporary wing commander in October.

No. 24 Squadron's complement in November 1941 consisted of one Fairey Battle, three De Havilland Moth Minor biplane trainers, five Lockheed Hudson twin-engined light bombers, and eleven CAC Wirraway monoplane trainers. The two-seat Wirraways were expected to be employed in operations as fighters, but were suitable for such a role "only in the minds of the Air Board", in the words of RAAF historian Alan Stephens. On 1 December, RAAF Headquarters in Melbourne put Lerew's squadron on notice for deployment to Rabaul as an advance garrison in the defence of northern Australia.

=== Preparations at Rabaul ===
No. 24 Squadron's Hudsons began moving to Vunakanau airfield, Rabaul, from RAAF Station Townsville in far-north Queensland on 5 December 1941. By the middle of the month they had been joined by the unit's Wirraways. Vunakanau afforded little shelter for staff or aircraft, and Japanese reconnaissance planes were already active in the vicinity, suggesting an attack was imminent. No. 24 Squadron began carrying out reconnaissance missions with its Hudsons, and on one occasion attempted to bomb an enemy ship without success. RAAF Headquarters threatened to relieve Lerew for his apparent lack of results and delays in communications, and demanded to know his excuses. Possessed of what the official history of the RAAF in World War II described as an "impish irreverence", Lerew listed among his reasons "disappointment in the lack of assistance rendered by the Almighty". He later reported that he was being caused "more worry" by his own headquarters in "the south than from the enemy situated in the north".

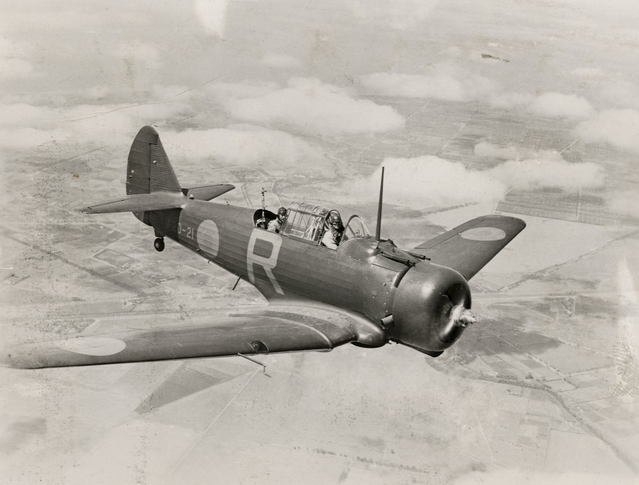
Wirraway similar to those in No. 24 Squadron

No. 24 Squadron's strength at the beginning of 1942 was four Hudsons, six Wirraways, and 130 staff. On New Year's Day, Lerew led the Hudsons on a raid against Kapingamarangi Island, igniting a fuel dump that was still burning when the squadron returned to follow up the attack two days later. During 4–7 January, Vunakanau airfield suffered four raids by unescorted Japanese bombers, destroying all but one of the Hudsons. Although the Wirraways were scrambled to intercept attackers on several occasions, their rate of climb was so poor that only once did one of them manage to engage an enemy seaplane, without result; this action, on 6 January, was the first air-to-air combat between RAAF and Japanese forces. At this point, Lerew signalled headquarters for six "modern fighters" with which to defend his airfield; none were forthcoming.

Squadron Leader Arch Tindal, Northern Area Command Armaments Officer, added his weight to Lerew's pleas for modern aircraft. Tindal had arrived to inspect No. 24 Squadron in the middle of an enemy attack on 3 January, and immediately leapt into the nearest Wirraway to attempt an interception. He later submitted a report to headquarters at Townsville, echoing Lerew's concerns regarding the Wirraway's capabilities and warning that "Rabaul is now wide open to bombing attack". Despite this, morale remained high in the unit; Lerew remarked on the devil-may-care attitude of his personnel, who frequently waited until the last moment to take cover during air raids. On 17 January, Lerew was able to gain sufficient height in his Wirraway to confront a Japanese seaplane in a head-on attack, but his .303 machine-gun ammunition was not sufficient to bring it down. In 1956, while at a conference in Tokyo, he coincidentally met the Japanese plane's pilot, who informed him that his lone assault had damaged an engine and killed two crewmen, adding that Lerew was "the bravest enemy I ever faced".

=== Invasion of Rabaul ===
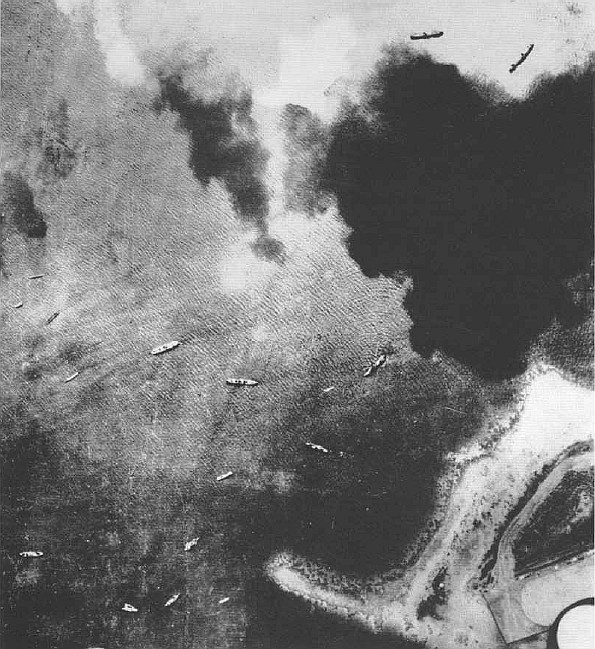
Japanese fleet to be employed in the invasion of Rabaul, photographed by an RAAF Hudson over Truk on 9 January 1942

On 20 January, a force of over 100 Japanese aircraft, comprising bombers, dive bombers and fighter escort, converged on Rabaul. It was led by Commander Mitsuo Fuchida, who had controlled the attack on Pearl Harbor on 7 December 1941. Two patrolling Wirraways of No. 24 Squadron attacked the first wave of Japanese raiders. Lerew's six remaining Wirraways then scrambled, one crashing on take-off. Of the seven that were airborne, three were shot down into the sea by Mitsubishi Zero fighters, two others crash landed with severe damage, one escaped with minor damage, and one remained unscathed. The ten-minute action killed six RAAF aircrew and wounded five. An Australian soldier on the ground later recalled, "We sat at our guns, shocked by the massacre we had just observed". The Japanese fighters compounded the humiliation by executing aerobatics over the bombed airfield. Lerew signalled headquarters, "Two Wirraways useless defence. Will you now please send some fighters?", receiving the reply, "Regret inability to supply fighters. If we had them you would get them." The next day he was ordered to attack the approaching Japanese fleet with "all available aircraft". As his two serviceable Wirraways had no bomb racks, this left only the one remaining Hudson with which to execute the order; it duly took off to search for the enemy ships, but was unable to locate them by nightfall, and returned to base.

It was following a further directive from headquarters on 21 January 1942 to keep his airfield "open", that Lerew, after discussion with his intelligence staff, sent the signal that made him famous: "Morituri vos salutamus". The message flummoxed headquarters, until an officer familiar with Latin decoded it as the legendary phrase used by ancient gladiators to honour their Emperor: "We who are about to die salute you!" Lerew also chose to ignore two other orders received from headquarters, firstly to turn his remaining ground staff and aircrew into infantrymen to assist with the army's defence and secondly to leave Rabaul in his remaining Hudson to take command of a new squadron in Port Moresby, New Guinea. To the first order he replied that trained RAAF crews would be more valuable in future actions than in a last-ditch effort to repel the invader at Rabaul; to the second he simply turned a "blind eye", refusing to escape alone in the only aircraft left that could evacuate his personnel. On 22 January, he sent off ninety-six staff in the Hudson and in flying boats called in from Port Moresby. Others escaped overland or in boats; Lerew's careful planning helped ensure that only three of his men were captured by the Japanese.

=== Later war service ===
Following the evacuation of Rabaul, Lerew took command of a composite squadron in Port Moresby which later became No. 32 (General Reconnaissance) Squadron. On 11 February 1942, he led a flight of three Hudsons in a raid on Gasmata harbour, making what the official history of the RAAF in World War II described as "the first mast-height attack on enemy shipping in the New Guinea campaign". Having set two ships on fire, the Hudsons were attacked by enemy fighters and two were shot down, including Lerew's. With his aircraft in flames, he ordered his crew to bail out of the rear hatch while he parachuted from the front window. Lerew landed in the jungle and narrowly avoided capture before making his way to a Coastwatcher post and returning to Port Moresby in a schooner, nine days after having been posted missing; his crew members had died. On 7 April, Lerew was awarded the Distinguished Flying Cross for "outstanding courage, determination, skill and tenacity in the course of bombing raids on enemy positions in New Britain". The success of the Gasmata operation prompted the Chief of the Air Staff to commend Lerew's squadron for the "effort required by both crews and ground personnel owing to our small numbers and general condition".

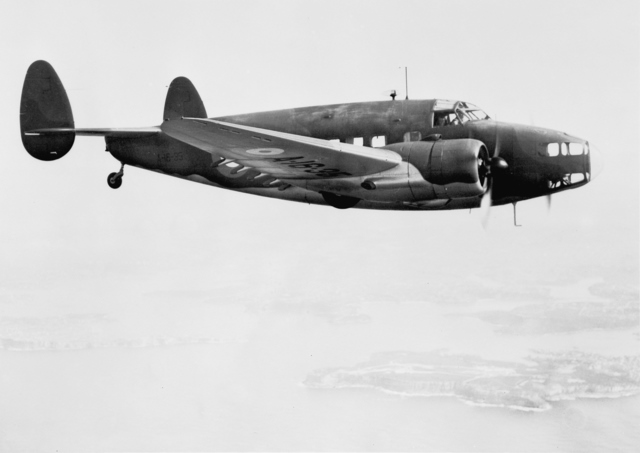
Hudson similar to those in Nos. 24 and 32 Squadrons

Returning to Australia, Lerew held base commands including RAAF Station Townsville, RAAF Station Nowra in New South Wales, and Batchelor Airfield near Darwin, Northern Territory. He led No. 7 Squadron, operating Bristol Beauforts out of first Nowra and then Townsville, from August to December 1942. He then returned to RAAF Station Laverton to take charge of No. 1 Aircraft Depot (No. 1 AD). Lerew's biographer, Lex McAulay, speculated of this quick succession of postings across the country: "...it is easy to assume that this Wing Commander whose critical reports were seen by the War Cabinet, and who had twice escaped the enemy at close quarters, was not to be allowed personal contact with the media of the day until his experiences were no longer topical and were overtaken by more recent momentous events". Though degree-qualified in civil engineering, Lerew believed he was underused in the technical environment of No. 1 AD, and sought another overseas posting. Nevertheless, his tenure at Laverton helped prepare him for his later flying safety work. In September 1943, he investigated the crash of a Vultee Vengeance flown by an experienced aviator, and found that when rolling the aircraft to the right it was possible for the pilot's movements to release his safety harness, making it impossible for him to remain in his seat and control the aircraft. Lerew designed and developed a clip to prevent a recurrence of this mishap, which was later adopted worldwide for all such harnesses.

Lerew was posted to RAAF Overseas Headquarters, London, in December 1943. He travelled via the United States, meeting film stars Bing Crosby, Bob Hope, and Dorothy Lamour on the set of Road to Utopia at Los Angeles in February 1944. In London, he undertook study of RAF and USAAF methods of operations, as well as diplomatic duties. Of the invasion of France on 6 June 1944, he wrote: "There has been no rejoicing. A hushed quietness has descended over London and all of England. Most people have relatives in it, and there is only one wish: that is, that it will end quickly. It is depressing to be playing no part in it." Later in the year, Lerew was invested with his Distinguished Flying Cross by King George VI at Buckingham Palace. He returned to Australia in early 1945, and married Laurie Steele, the Australian-born widow of a Royal Air Force night-fighter pilot, having met her when he was stationed in England. The couple had two daughters, but eventually divorced. In March, Lerew took part in the investigation into the crash of a Hudson carrying Major General George Vasey; he determined that the pilot's lack of experience in instrument flying had been a factor, and recommended further such training for RAAF flight crew. Promoted group captain, he formed the Directorate of Flying Safety in June 1945 and served as its inaugural Director. Believing that the promotion of flying safety in the RAAF cut across both administrative and operational spheres, and aware of the notorious feud between the service's two senior officers, Air Vice Marshals George Jones and Bill Bostock, Lerew had proposed that the new directorate be placed squarely under the auspices of Jones as Chief of the Air Staff, with authority to demand free access to information from all other directorates.

== Post-war career and later life ==
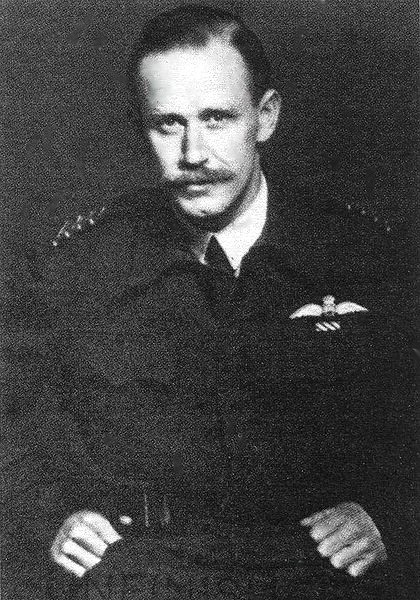
Lerew c. 1945–46

Dubious about the prospects for advancement in the post-war military, Lerew applied for a role in the recently established Provisional International Civil Aviation Organization (PICAO) in March 1946, while still Director of Flying Safety in the RAAF. He had just been appointed Air Officer Commanding North-Western Area in Darwin on 7 October 1946 when PICAO offered him the position of Technical Officer, which he accepted. He left the RAAF on 8 November 1946, emigrating to Montreal, Canada, to take up his new employment with PICAO, which became ICAO in 1947. Appointed Chief of Aerodromes, Air Routes and Ground Aids Section in January 1951, he conducted assessments of airfields throughout the world, and led the team that recommended Hellinikon be developed as Athens' international airport. Lerew received credit for several of ICAO's accomplishments over the next decade, including administrative reforms within the organisation and finalising a standard runway approach lighting system in 1953 following five years of disagreement among members. A colleague remembered him as having "that very fortunate duality of personality, being serious, efficient and knowledgeable in his official capacity, with an equally inherent twin ability to really liven things up off-duty".

In Mexico on 20 August 1966, Lerew married Josephine Henriette Oude Reimerink, a Dutch national he had met three years earlier. He was promoted ICAO's Chief of Flight Branch in April 1969, in which capacity he served until retiring from the organisation in 1972. In retirement, Lerew and his wife restored houses and travelled extensively. Their expeditions resulted in two narrow escapes, in December 1974 when they tired of the oppressively humid weather in Darwin and left just before Cyclone Tracy struck on Christmas Day, and in February 1976 when they decided to camp well away from Lake Atitlan, Guatemala, which was devastated soon after by an earthquake that left over 22,000 people dead. The couple eventually settled in Vancouver, where John Lerew died of cancer on 24 February 1996, aged eighty-three. He was survived by Josephine and the children of his first marriage.
