= Laroo =

Laroo may refer to:

- Laroo T.H.H., American rapper
- Saskia Laroo (born 1959), Dutch jazz musician
