= 1953 London to Christchurch air race =

Last Great Air Race

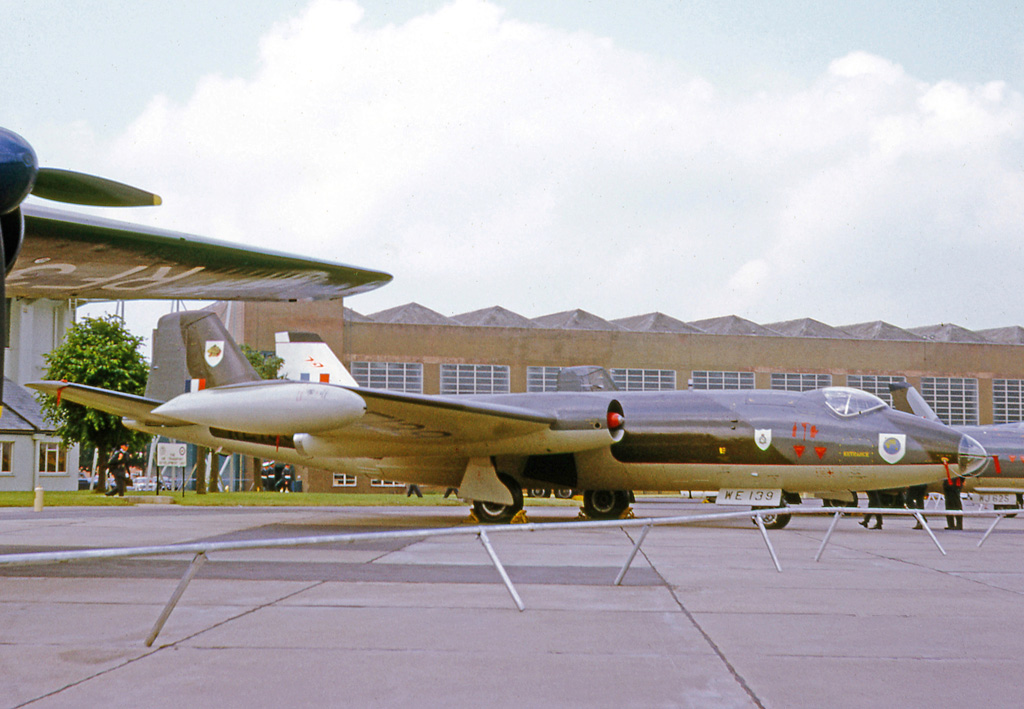
The race winner WE139, competitor "3", an RAF English Electric Canberra piloted by Flight Lieutenant Burton, shown at RAF Abingdon, now on display at the RAF Museum in London

The 1953 London to Christchurch air race, the "Last Great Air Race", was about 12,000 miles (19,000 km) long, from London Airport (now London Heathrow) to Christchurch International Airport in New Zealand, and took place in October 1953 after Christchurch declared their airport as international in 1950. It was intended to mark the centenary of Christchurch, also in 1950, and 50 years since the Wright brothers' first powered flight in 1903.

As part of the festivities, Air New Zealand sponsored a beauty pageant 19 October 1953. The winner was Patsy Lloyd, followed by 1st runner up Patricia Boswell (Cantwell) and Shirley Cutler.

== Race description ==
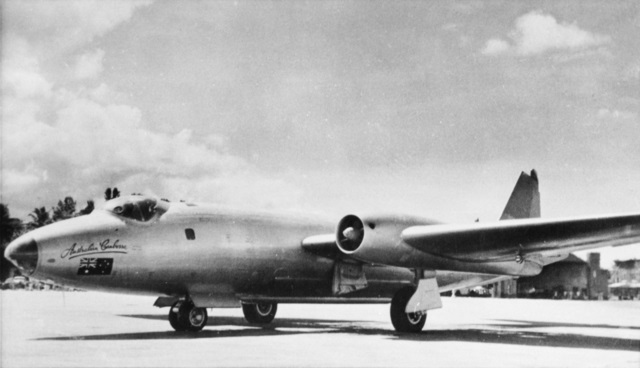
Wing Commander Cuming's RAAF Canberra B20, competitor "4", during a refuelling stop at Colombo, Ceylon

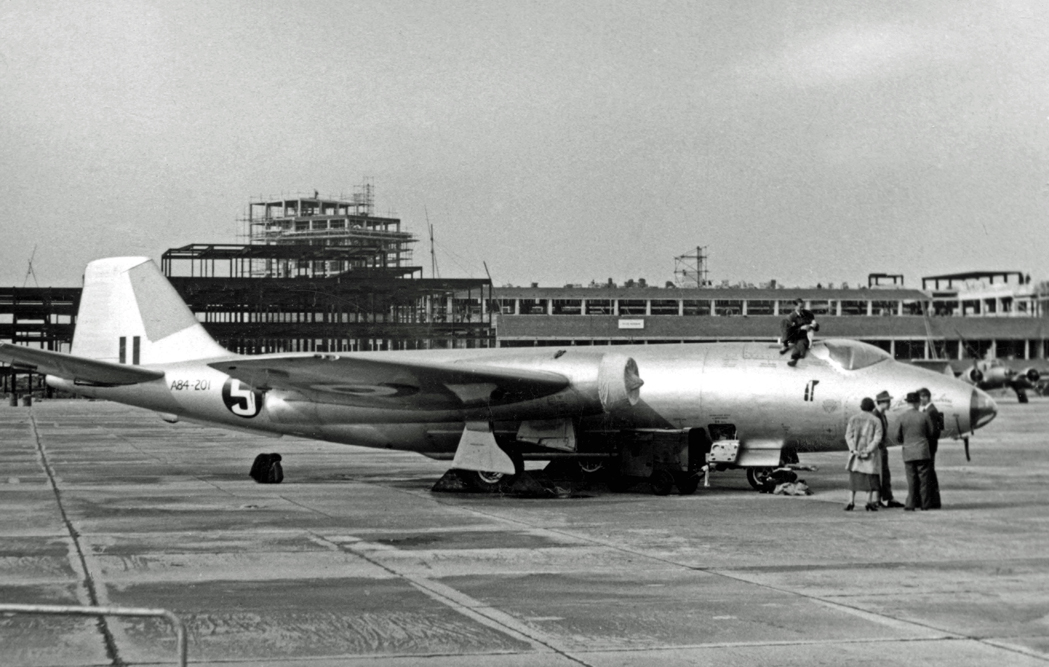
Squadron Leader Raw's RAAF Canberra B20, competitor "5", at London Airport awaiting the race

Map of the race

Canterbury International Air Race Council was formed in Christchurch in 1948 to plan the race, together with the British Royal Aero Club. It was divided into an outright Speed Section, and a Handicap Section for commercial-type transport aircraft. Each plane was allowed to select its own route, as long as it was generally south-east, and any necessary intermediate stops. Several planes dropped out before it began; this left five military turbojet bombers and three propeller-driven transport planes.

The race started on Thursday 8 October at 16:30 GMT. The time in New Zealand was 12 hours ahead, as British Summer Time had ended four days earlier, and New Zealand didn't use daylight saving time then. (Note: In reports, the time in Australia was GMT + 8:00 (western), 9:30 (central) or 10:00 (eastern); daylight saving time was not used then.) The three transport planes took off at five-minute intervals. The military jets followed, again at five-minute intervals, starting at 17:35; they were delayed by an hour, to avoid a photo finish in the dark about 24 hours later. Each plane was allowed 168 hours of elapsed time from the final plane's takeoff.

The planes flew direct from London to the Middle East, except the DC-6A (via Italy) and the Hastings (via Greece). After that, most of the routes were broadly similar, flying in almost a straight line via Ceylon, Cocos (Keeling) Islands and southern Australia. Canberra number "1" even managed to fly past Cocos without stopping. However, the DC-6A flew further north, via Pakistan (West), Burma, Indonesia and northern Australia. A great circle route would have been a few hundred miles shorter, over Finland and Japan.

The prizes for each Section were the same: 1st £10,000; 2nd £3000; 3rd £1000; 4th £500. These are New Zealand pounds, which matched UK pounds at the time. The Handicap Section, rather than a race, was intended to be a trial based on a formula aimed at rewarding commercial efficiency over a long-haul route.

The Speed Section was won by a Royal Air Force English Electric Canberra PR3 flown by Flight Lieutenant Roland (Monty) Burton and navigated by Flight Lieutenant Don Gannon. The plane touched down at Christchurch (Harewood) Airport at 05:37 local time during a heavy storm, 40 minutes quicker than its closest rival, after 23 h 52 min, including 83 minutes on the ground. This record still held in 2025, and is equivalent to 494 mph (795 km/h) around a great circle separation of 11,791 mi (18,976 km). The Harewood Gold Cup was awarded to the winners, and the prize of £10,000 was paid to the RAF Benevolent Fund. Second in the Speed Section was Squadron Leader Peter Raw of No. 1 Long Range Flight RAAF in an Australian-built Canberra. The distance, by the route followed, was quoted as 12,270 mi (19,750 km), so that the speed in the air for all five jets was 544–548 miles per hour (875–882 km/h), with an average overall speed (including intermediate stops) of 402 mph (647 km/h).

The Canberras were all fitted with extra fuel tanks in the bomb bays. To deal with the extra weight, the two PR3 planes' engines were tweaked to give more thrust, and larger main-wheel hubs and brakes fitted. Any wingtip fuel tanks or pods seen on the Canberras were absent during the race. The three RAF Canberras were built as photo-reconnaissance planes. The Canberras flew with a pilot and navigator; the RAAF planes also included a co-pilot.

In the transport Handicap Section, a BEA Vickers Viscount finished first, followed by a Douglas DC-6A of KLM Royal Dutch Airlines which was declared the winner on handicap. A Royal New Zealand Air Force Handley Page Hastings also took part. The Viscount was fitted with extra fuel tanks in place of seats, enabling it to fly in five stages, as opposed to eight for the DC-6A; the Hastings had also expected to fly in eight stages. The handicap deductions were well-known before leaving London, meaning the Viscount was almost bound to lose, but BEA and Vickers welcomed the publicity from the race. The DC-6A's adjusted time was 49:57 − 44:30 = 5:27 (this is often misquoted as 37:30, but that was the elapsed time to Darwin).

The Douglas DC-6A, "21", carried 64 passengers, including many Dutch women emigrating to marry or join their husbands. The same passengers left Schiphol (Amsterdam) for London on the day before, on a KLM Douglas DC-6B, PH-TFN "Abel Tasman". The race plane was labelled "DC-6A", built as a dual-purpose or convertible plane, with some seats, and cargo doors. It carried the name "Dr. Ir. M.H. Damme", plus "Trade Wings". Dokter Ingenieur Marinus Hendricus Damme was a Dutch engineer, aviation businessman and politician. DC-6A planes were also called "Liftmaster". A Dutch "bride flight" in July 1952 is sometimes confused with this one.

The Handley Page Hastings, "22", carried cargo for the New Zealand Air Force. After stopping at Athens (Greece), Shaibah (near Basra, Iraq) and Masirah Island (Oman), an engine was ruined by a storm near Ceylon, then the flaps were damaged while landing at Negombo (Ceylon), causing the plane to withdraw from the race. It remained stranded there for ten days. The Hastings has been described as the world's last four-engine tail-wheel transport giant.

The Vickers Viscount, "23", was loaned from the British Ministry of Supply to BEA, with BEA livery applied, and named "RMA Endeavour", for "Royal Mail Aircraft" and Captain James Cook's ship HMS Endeavour. Among the crew was John Profumo, Parliamentary Secretary to the Ministry of Civil Aviation. It made four stops, averaging only 18 minutes each, at Bahrein, Negombo, Cocos and Melbourne (Australia). (Note: The Viscount was falsely reported to have landed at Athens. Two amateur videos show Christchurch footage as "Athens". Other sources say it first landed at Bahrein. The tally board for the Viscount at Athens was blank.) At Melbourne, after flying non-stop for 3,530 mi (5,680 km), it had to be towed from the runway, having run out of fuel. Its lack of passengers and cargo led to it being declared second for this Section, behind the DC-6A. The Viscount was the world's first turboprop-powered airliner.

During the race, the time of arrival and departure of each plane at each airport was logged on a pair of "tally boards", located at the headquarters of Australia's Department of Civil Aviation in Melbourne. The press and public were present to witness the progress. Unfortunately the boards omitted five of the times.

The transport planes being displayed at London Airport before the race

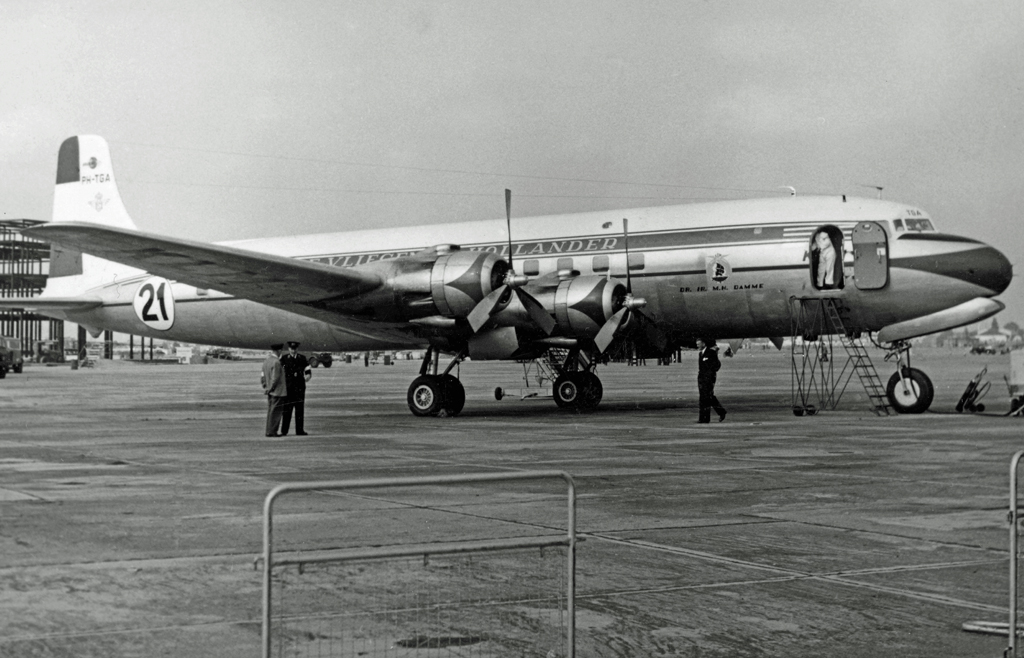
KLM's Douglas DC-6A was competitor "21" and carried a group of emigrants to New Zealand

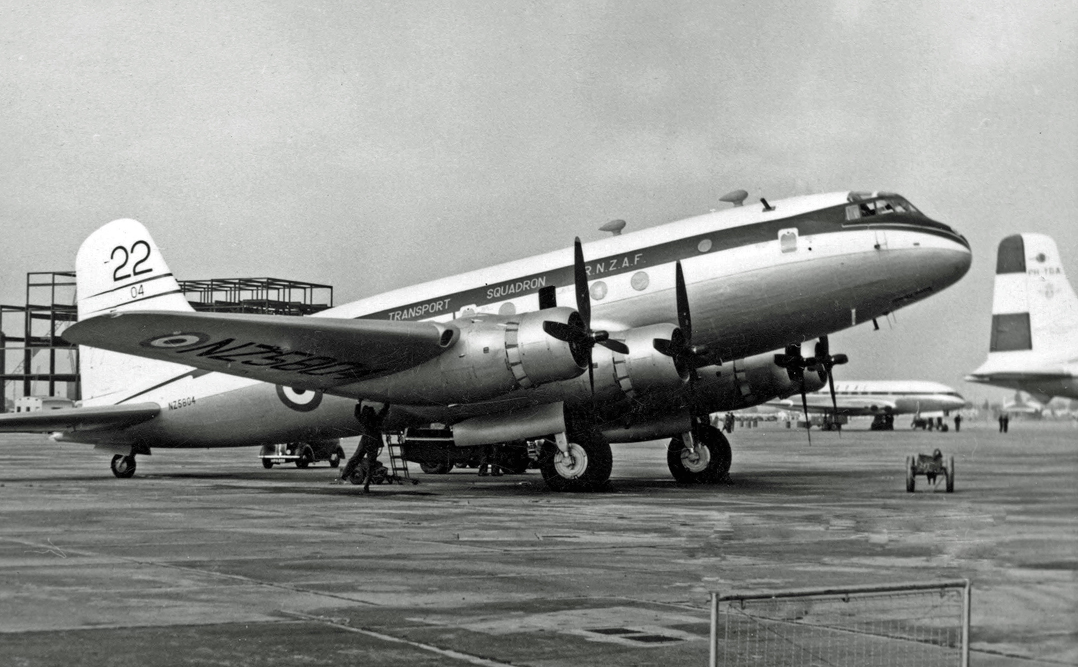
Competitor "22", RNZAF Handley Page Hastings

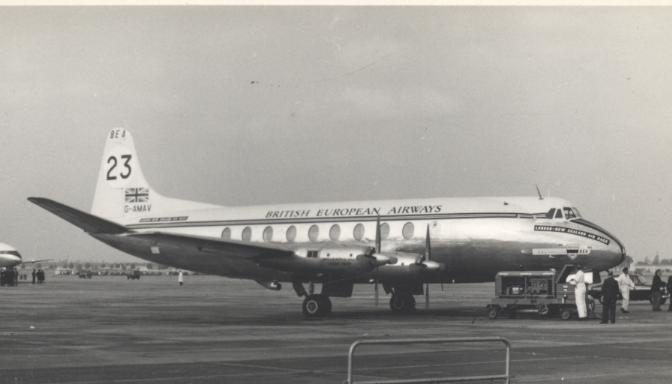
Vickers Viscount in BEA markings as competitor "23"

== Competitors ==
							Time (h:min)		Speed (mph, km/h) (Note: Calculated using 12,270 mi, except 13,064 mi for "21".)		(h:min)
Number	Result	Pilot	Operator	Aircraft	Identity	Stops	Elapsed	Ground	Overall	Flying	Note
Speed Section
1	4	Wing Commander Hodges	540 Squadron Royal Air Force	Canberra PR7	WH773	3	35:32	13:06	345 (555)	546 (879)	Bad generator at Perth (12:19)
2	3	Flight Lieutenant Furze	540 Squadron Royal Air Force	Canberra PR3	WE142	4	24:35	2:02	499 (803)	544 (875)	Bad starter in Iraq (1:10). Bad wheel in Ceylon (0:30)
3	1	Flight Lieutenant Burton	540 Squadron Royal Air Force	Canberra PR3	WE139	4	23:52	1:23	514 (827)	545 (877)	The "speed" winner
4	5	Wing Commander Cuming	No. 1 Long Range Flight Royal Australian Air Force	Canberra B20	A84-202	4	80:10	57:47	153 (246)	548 (882)	Burst tyre at Cocos (55:00)
5	2	Squadron Leader Raw	No. 1 Long Range Flight Royal Australian Air Force	Canberra B20	A84-201	4	24:32	2:05	500 (800)	546 (879)	Frozen nose wheel at Woomera (1:26)
Handicap Section
21	1	Captain Kooper	KLM	Douglas DC-6A	PH-TGA	7	49:57	3:03	261 (420)	278 (447)	44:30 handicap deduction. The "handicap" winner
22	_	Wing Commander Watson	41 Squadron Royal New Zealand Air Force	Handley Page HP.95 Hastings C3	NZ5804	_	_	_	_	_	35:00 handicap deduction. Withdrew in Ceylon with a failed engine
23	2	Captain Baillie	British European Airways	Vickers Viscount 700	G-AMAV	4	40:42	1:12	301 (484)	310 (500)	No handicap deduction

== Airports ==
Ground time durations (h:min)
Country	City	Airport	1	2	3	4	5	21	22	23
UK	London	London	dep.	dep.	dep.	dep.	dep.	dep.	dep.	dep.
Italy	Rome	Ciampino						0:22		
Greece	Athens	Ellinikon							0:27	
Iraq	Baghdad	Baghdad West Airport						0:17		
Iraq	Basra	RAF Shaibah	0:30	1:10	0:30				0:29	
Bahrein	Bahrein	Bahrein				0:12	0:15			0:15
Oman	Masirah	RAF Masirah							0:25 (Note: Tally board had only ETA.)	
Pakistan (West)	Karachi	Karachi						0:25		
Ceylon	Colombo	RAF Negombo	0:17	0:30					end	0:18
Ceylon	Colombo	Ratmalana			0:14 (Note: Shows that the RAF's Ratmalana stop was planned. Some sources list Negombo instead.)	0:14	0:14			
Burma	Rangoon	Rangoon						0:31		
(Indian Ocean)	Cocos (Keeling)	Cocos Island		0:11	0:22	55:00 (Note: Tally board departure was prefixed with "11", meaning "11 October".)	0:10			0:22
Indonesia	Djakarta	Kemayoran						0:26		
Australia	Perth	Perth	12:19	0:11	0:17					
Australia	Darwin	Darwin						0:25		
Australia	Woomera	RAAF Base Woomera					1:26			
Australia	Brisbane	Eagle Farm						0:37		
Australia	Melbourne	Essendon								0:17
Australia	Melbourne	RAAF Base Laverton (Note: Not to be confused with Laverton Airport, Western Australia.)				2:21 (Note: Tally board arrival was prefixed with "11", meaning "11 October". Departure and final arrival were blank. Melbourne departure 09:20 eastern Australian time = 23:20 GMT.)				
New Zealand	Christchurch	Harewood	arr.	arr.	arr.	arr.	arr.	arr.		arr.

== In popular culture ==
The drama film Bride Flight was released in 2008.
