= No. 4 Group RAAF =

No. 4 (Maintenance) Group RAAF
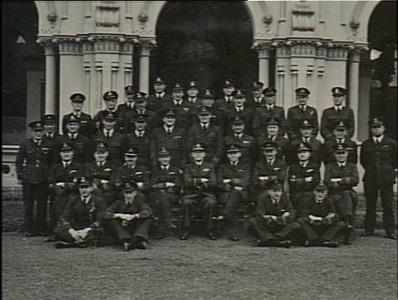
- Staff officers of No. 4 (Maintenance) Group, July 1946
- Active: 1942–1953
- Country: Australia
- Branch: Royal Australian Air Force
- Headquarters: Melbourne

Commanders
- Notable commanders: Arthur Murphy

No. 4 (Maintenance) Group RAAF was a Royal Australian Air Force (RAAF) group. It was formed in Melbourne in September 1942 as part of a reorganisation of the air force that saw maintenance functions transferred from area commands to dedicated functional groups. In July 1947, No. 4 (Maintenance) Group was renamed Maintenance Group. The area command structure was superseded by a functional command system in October 1953, and Maintenance Group was re-formed as Maintenance Command.

== History ==
On 23 May 1942, Australian Prime Minister John Curtin agreed to a proposal by Air Vice-Marshal George Jones, the RAAF Chief of the Air Staff, to establish up to five maintenance groups as part of a broader reorganisation of the air force along semi-functional, semi-geographical lines. These groups were to be tasked with supporting the RAAF's five operational area commands. No. 5 (Maintenance) Group was the first to be established; it was formed on 1 June 1942, headquartered in Sydney, and disbanded on 13 January 1946.

No. 4 (Maintenance) Group was the only other maintenance group to be formed by the RAAF. It was raised on 14 September 1942, under the command of Air Commodore Arthur Murphy, and headquartered in Melbourne. No. 4 Group was responsible for administering the RAAF maintenance units located in Victoria, Tasmania and South Australia. As of early 1943, the group reported directly to RAAF Headquarters.

On 19 July 1947, No. 4 (Maintenance) Group was re-designated Maintenance Group. The same month, its headquarters began re-locating from Irving Road, Toorak, to Albert Park Barracks. In October 1953, the RAAF's area command system was superseded by a functional command system made up of Home, Training, and Maintenance Commands. The Maintenance Group headquarters in Melbourne was re-formed as Maintenance Command headquarters.
