= Monty Burton =

Royal Air Force officer

- Born: Roland Louis Ernest Burton; 18 May 1918; Forest Gate London
- Died: 29 April 1999 (aged 80); France
- Military career
- Allegiance: United Kingdom
- Branch: Royal Air Force
- Service years: 28.09.1937 –1958
- Rank: Squadron Leader
- Nickname: Monty
- Service number: 50530
- Awards: Air Force Cross

Roland Louis Ernest Burton AFC and Bar (known as Monty Burton) (18 May 1918 – 28 April 1999) was a British pilot who won the 1953 London to Christchurch air race.

== London to Christchurch air race ==
Flight Lieutenant Burton became the first man to fly from London to New Zealand in under 24 hours, when with his navigator Flight Lieutenant Don Gannon he won the 1953 London to Christchurch air race in a Canberra PR3 in 1953, winning the Britannia Trophy, now in the RAF Museum, Hendon.

== Family life ==
Burton married Joan Evans (1942) and they had two daughters and a son. One of his daughters Jocelyn Burton became a successful silver and goldsmith. His son Michael Burton (1949–2011) was also a talented silversmith. Burton retired to France where he died on 29 April 1999.
