= David Evans (RAAF officer) =

Royal Australian Air Force chief (1925–2020)

- Evans (right) and his wife, Gail, five days after their wedding in 1948
- Born: Selwyn David Evans; 3 June 1925; Paddington, New South Wales
- Died: 2 September 2020 (aged 95); Canberra
- Military career
- Allegiance: Australia
- Service/branch: Royal Australian Air Force
- Service years: 1943–1985
- Rank: Air Marshal
- Units: No. 38 Squadron (1945–1948); RAAF Squadron Berlin Air Lift (1948–1949); Governor-General's Flight (1954–1956)
- Commands: No. 2 Squadron (1967–1968); RAAF Base Amberley (1975–1977); Chief of the Air Staff (1982–1985)
- Conflicts: Berlin Airlift; Vietnam War
- Awards: Companion of the Order of Australia; Distinguished Service Order; Air Force Cross
- Other work: Author; consultant

Air Marshal Selwyn David Evans, AC, DSO, AFC (3 June 1925 – 2 September 2020) was a senior commander of the Royal Australian Air Force (RAAF), and a writer and consultant on defence matters. He served as Chief of the Air Staff from 1982 to 1985. After leaving the RAAF, he published two military treatises, A Fatal Rivalry: Australia's Defence at Risk and War: A Matter of Principles, as well as an autobiography.

Enlisting in the Air Force in 1943, Evans graduated from flying school as a sergeant pilot, and was converting to Beaufort bombers when World War II ended. He gained his commission as a pilot officer in 1947. From 1948 to 1949, he was a member of the Australian contingent operating C-47 Dakota transports in the Berlin Airlift. He was a flying instructor in the early 1950s, before becoming a VIP captain with the Governor-General's Flight in 1954. His service in the flight earned him the Air Force Cross in 1957. In the 1960s Evans was twice posted to No. 2 Squadron, flying Canberra jet bombers, first as a flight commander when the unit was based in Malaysia from 1960 to 1962, then as its commanding officer during the Vietnam War from 1967 to 1968. The Canberras achieved a high degree of accuracy on their bombing missions under his leadership, and he was awarded the Distinguished Service Order after completing his tour in Vietnam.

Evans held senior staff positions in the early 1970s before serving as Officer Commanding RAAF Base Amberley from 1975 to 1977. Promoted to air vice-marshal, he then became Chief of Air Force Operations. In this role, he worked to improve the RAAF's strategy for the defence of Australia, to fully exploit the "air–sea gap" on the northern approaches to the continent. Appointed Officer of the Order of Australia in 1981, he was Chief of Joint Operations and Plans in the Australian Defence Force (ADF) before his promotion to air marshal and Chief of the Air Staff in April 1982. As head of the Air Force, he focussed on morale, air power doctrine, and improving defensive capabilities in northern Australia. He was raised to Companion of the Order of Australia in 1984.

Retiring from the RAAF in May 1985, Evans began to write and lecture on defence matters, and also stood for election in federal politics. He was a board member of and defence advisor to British Aerospace Australia from 1990 to 2009, and chairman of the National Capital Authority from 1997 to 2003. In 2001, he was awarded the Centenary Medal for his services to the ADF and the Canberra community.

== Early career ==
Selwyn Evans, known by his middle name of David, was born in the Sydney suburb of Paddington on 3 June 1925. The son of policeman Selwyn Douglas Evans and his wife Eileen, David was educated at Marist Brothers College in Mosman. A schoolboy when war was declared, he avidly followed reports of Allied fighter aces during the Battle of Britain and resolved that, once he was old enough, he would serve as a pilot. He subsequently became one of the earliest recruits to the Air Training Corps, established in 1941 to provide basic training for youths aged 16 to 18 whose ambition was to become aircrew in the Royal Australian Air Force. After spending a short time as a bank clerk, Evans enlisted in the RAAF on 5 June 1943. He received instruction under the Empire Air Training Scheme, firstly at No. 2 Initial Training School in Bradfield Park, Sydney, then at No. 5 Elementary Flying Training School in Narromine, New South Wales, and finally at No. 8 Service Flying Training School in Bundaberg, Queensland. After graduating as a sergeant pilot, he was posted in October 1944 to the flying staff of No. 1 Air Observer School at Evans Head, New South Wales. Promoted to flight sergeant, Evans was in the middle of a Bristol Beaufort light bomber conversion course at No. 1 Operational Training Unit in East Sale, Victoria, when the war ended on 14 August 1945. His Air Force career should have finished then and there, as he was slated for demobilisation along with thousands of other wartime enlistees. Evans was determined to remain and travelled to RAAF Headquarters in Melbourne to take his case to the officer responsible for discharges. He found a sympathetic ear and within days was transferred to No. 38 Squadron, with which he flew C-47 Dakota transports on a regular courier service to Japan between October 1945 and May 1948.

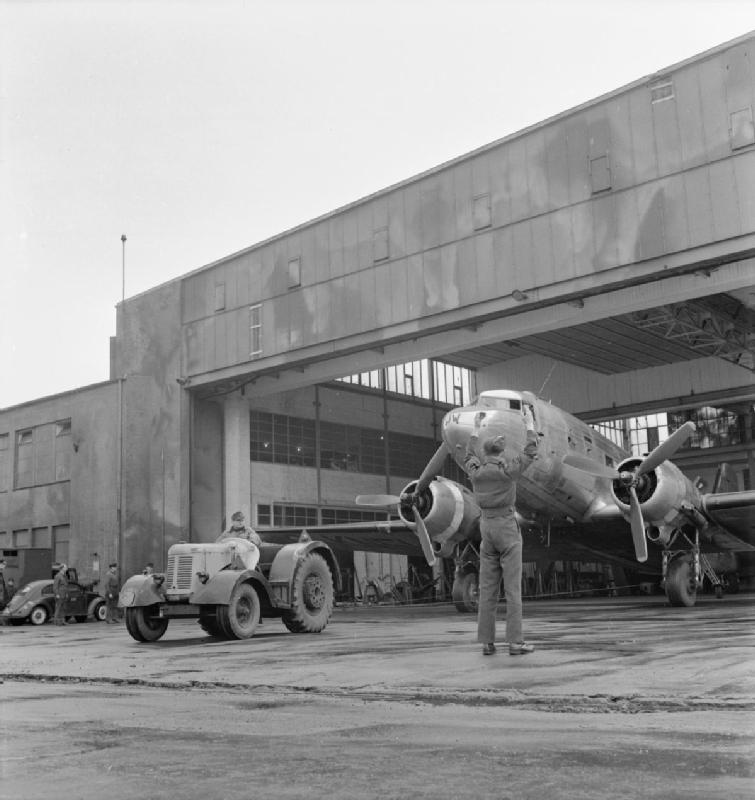
RAF Dakota at Lübeck, West Germany, during the Berlin Airlift, April 1949

Evans was commissioned as a pilot officer on 3 March 1947, becoming the most junior name in the 1947 Air Force List of serving officers according to seniority. On 23 August 1948 he married Dorothy (Gail) Campbell, the daughter of a Merchant Navy captain; the couple had three daughters and a son. They had planned to wed on 29 August but had to bring the ceremony forward when Evans was selected to take part in Australia's contribution to the Berlin Airlift. Having been promoted to flying officer, he departed Sydney on 28 August, bound for London. From there he joined RAAF Squadron Berlin Air Lift—which comprised crews from Nos. 36 and 38 Squadrons and was based in Lübeck, West Germany—and over the next 14 months flew over 250 sorties in Royal Air Force Dakotas. Airlift operations were considered particularly challenging, as aircraft were expected to fly on instruments their entire route, often in inclement weather, and keep just three minutes separation. On one occasion, Evans and his crew discovered that boxes of condoms were their main cargo. According to Air Force historian Alan Stephens, "as they took off into a bleak, snow-filled night they found themselves questioning the worth of the sortie, an attitude which doubtless was not shared by the eventual recipients". Evans's worst moment was when one of his engines failed just after take-off, with 23 passengers—mostly children—aboard, but he was able to land safely.

Returning to Australia in November 1949, Evans was posted to Central Flying School (CFS) at RAAF Base East Sale, Victoria, where he qualified as a flying instructor. He served in this capacity for the next four years, including an exchange posting with the Royal New Zealand Air Force from May 1951 to July 1953. As he was preparing to depart New Zealand, he received word that his next posting would be to the Korean War as a pilot with No. 77 Squadron; the armistice prevented this and he returned to No. 38 Squadron as an instructor. In 1954 he was assigned to transporting VIPs, serving with the Governor-General's Flight (later No. 34 (Special Transport) Squadron) until 1956. As well as Governor-General Sir William Slim and Lady Slim, his passengers included Prime Minister Robert Menzies and Prince Philip, Duke of Edinburgh. Promoted to squadron leader, Evans's service with the VIP flight earned him the Air Force Cross in the Queen's Birthday Honours promulgated in the London Gazette on 13 June 1957. The same year, he attended RAAF Staff College at Point Cook, Victoria. He became personal staff officer to the Minister for Air in 1958, a position he found valuable for the insight he gained into Australia's political culture. In November 1959, he took a refresher course at CFS, qualifying on De Havilland Vampire and English Electric Canberra jets. He underwent further training on Canberra bombers with No. 1 Operational Conversion Unit at RAAF Base Amberley, Queensland, graduating in May 1960. From then until 1962 he served as a flight commander in No. 2 Squadron, operating Canberras out of RAAF Base Butterworth, Malaysia. He subsequently attended the RAF College of Air Warfare. In January 1963, Evans was transferred to Air Staff Division, Canberra, where he helped formulate operational requirements for a new RAAF bomber. His final specification included a payload of 14,000 lb (6,400 kg), speed of Mach 2, and range of 1,100 nmi (2,000 km). This requirement was met by the General Dynamics F-111C, 24 of which were ordered by the Australian government in October 1963. As an interim measure until delivery of the F-111, the US government offered 24 Boeing B-47 Stratojets to the RAAF. Though the offer was never seriously considered, a B-47 was test flown from Amberley to Darwin in November 1963 by the Chief of the Air Staff, Air Marshal Val Hancock, with Evans as passenger. Evans had been assigned to fly the plane but was replaced at the last moment by Hancock; the take-off almost ended in disaster after Hancock unknowingly switched off the engines' water injection—needed to ensure sufficient thrust in hot conditions—that Evans had switched on before vacating the pilot's seat. In January 1965, Evans was posted to Washington, D.C., as assistant air attaché, having "had quite enough of writing Air Staff Requirements".

== Vietnam War and senior command ==
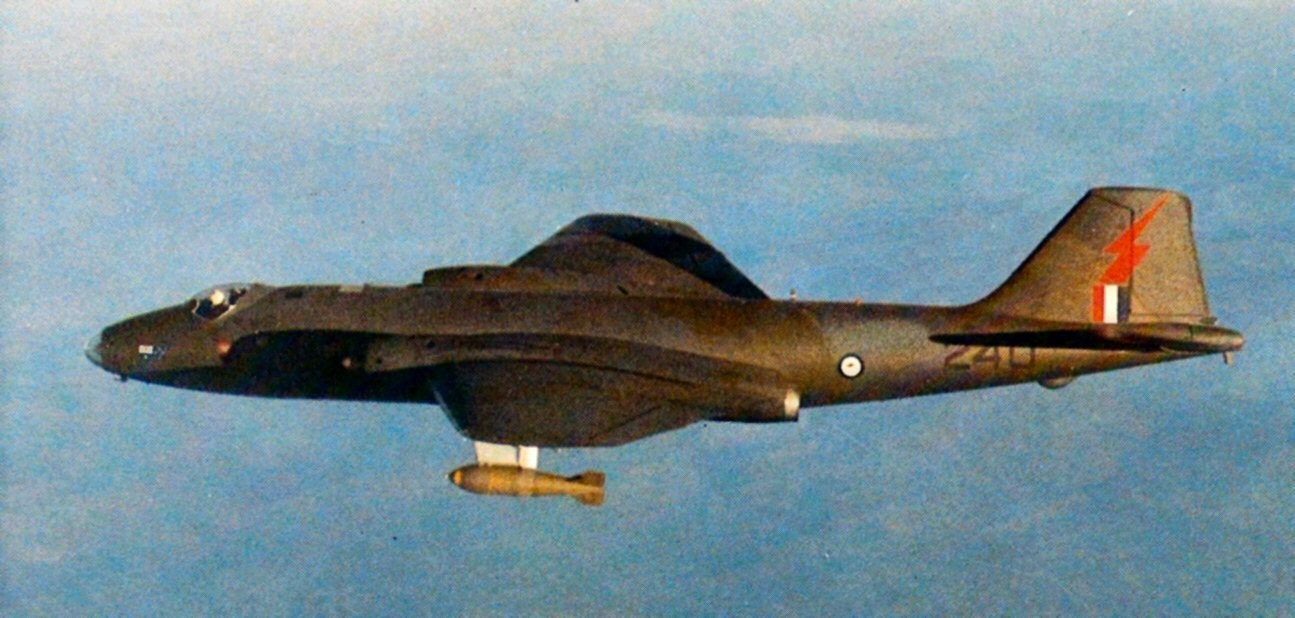
No. 2 Squadron Canberra over Vietnam

In April 1967, the Australian government committed No. 2 Squadron and its Canberra bombers to action in the Vietnam War. Operating from Phan Rang Air Base outside Saigon, under the direction of the US 35th Tactical Fighter Wing (TFW), the Canberras were initially engaged in medium-altitude missions against Viet Cong forces, guided by Sky Spot ground radar, usually at night. Promoted to wing commander, Evans assumed control of the squadron in December 1967. Having never heard a shot fired in anger in his 24 years of service, he was anxious for a combat assignment. The Japanese surrender in August 1945 had prevented him from seeing action in World War II, and the Korean War had ended just as he was on the verge of a posting for active duty with No. 77 Squadron. "Vietnam", he reasoned, "would be my last chance". By the time he took command, the Canberras were flying a greater proportion of their missions at lower levels in daylight, using visual bomb-aiming methods honed during their earlier service in Malaysia; this gave the bombers an average circular error probability (CEP) of 50 metres. Evans introduced intensive post-mission analysis to refine their technique, and permitted his pilots to bomb at the lowest level possible at which the bombsight would operate. The CEP was eventually reduced to 20 metres, making the Canberras the most accurate bombing force in the region. In January 1968, the unit participated in the air campaigns to defend Huế and Khe Sanh during the Tet Offensive. Phan Rang itself was often subjected to harassing attacks and mortar fire from the Viet Cong, requiring Evans to undertake improvements to the airfield's ground defences. He completed his posting to Vietnam in November 1968 and was awarded the Distinguished Service Order for his performance as commanding officer of No. 2 Squadron. The decoration was gazetted on 2 May 1969 and backdated to 13 March.

I had no qualms whatsoever about the Government's decision to go to war in Vietnam. I saw logic in the "domino theory"—I thought Australia's joining with the Americans was good insurance for the future. I did, however, think it was wrong to conscript young men to fight in Vietnam.

— Air Marshal Evans in his autobiography, 2011

Evans was promoted to group captain in January 1969 and appointed Director of Air Force Plans. In this position he proposed and organised the gift of 23 of the RAAF's old CAC Sabres to the Indonesian Air Force, following an earlier presentation of 10 Sabres to the Royal Malaysian Air Force. He completed studies at the Royal College of Defence Studies, London, in 1972. Returning to Australia, he was promoted to air commodore and appointed Director-General Plans and Policy, Air Force, in January 1973. He served as Officer Commanding RAAF Base Amberley from February 1975 until April 1977. In this role he qualified as a pilot on the recently delivered F-111C swing-wing bomber, as well as the UH-1 Iroquois helicopter. Following his tour as Amberley base commander, Evans was promoted to air vice marshal and became Chief of Air Force Operations (CAFOPS). He held this newly created position for the next two years, broken by a temporary posting as Deputy Chief of the Air Staff between January and August 1978. As CAFOPS, Evans played a major part in developing the RAAF's plans for the defence of Australia. Following America's announcement in the 1969 Guam Doctrine that its allies would have to assume greater self-reliance in their military affairs, Australia's strategic thought underwent a change from its earlier policy of "forward defence" to a more localised defensive posture. The consensus among RAAF planning staff was to adopt a "repulsion" concept of attacking an enemy force along the air and sea approaches to northern Australia, but Evans believed that this did not go far enough in exploiting the long-range offensive capabilities of such aircraft as the F-111. Convinced that Australia's numerically small forces would be hard-pressed to dislodge an invader that had gained a foothold on the continent, he refined the "repulsion" stance into what he termed an "anti-lodgement" strategy, focussing on defeating the enemy at its potential staging bases north of Australia and then, as a last resort, on the approaches closer to home. The Air Force's role in shaping an overall strategy that took advantage of the "air-sea gap" was later acknowledged in the Federal government paper The Defence of Australia 1987. Evans was appointed an Officer of the Order of Australia on 26 January 1981 for his achievements as CAFOPS.

In 1980, Evans was appointed Chief of Joint Operations and Plans for the Australian Defence Force (ADF). He was promoted to air marshal and became Chief of the Air Staff (CAS) on 21 April 1982, succeeding Air Marshal Sir Neville McNamara. As CAS, Evans took steps to enhance discipline, bearing and morale in the Air Force. He sponsored the development of an Australian air power doctrine, eventually published as the Air Power Manual under one of his successors, Air Marshal Ray Funnell, in 1990. Evans also commissioned a marching tune especially for the RAAF, later to be called "Eagles of Australia", to replace the Royal Air Force march that had been in use previously. As early as 1969, he had advocated permanently basing a squadron of fighter aircraft at RAAF Tindal in the Northern Territory. Tindal was one of a series of forward air bases initiated by Air Marshal Sir Frederick Scherger when he was CAS in 1959, but a defence committee decision prior to Evans becoming CAS had determined to locate the RAAF's northernmost fighter squadron at Darwin. His chance remark in mid-1982 to the new Minister of Defence, Ian Sinclair, regarding the suitability of Tindal over Darwin led to the former base being chosen as the home of No. 75 (Fighter) Squadron. Alan Stephens described the permanent manning of Tindal as having "formalised the shift to the strategy of defence-in-depth—of defending Australia by controlling its air-sea gap". Late in 1983, Evans selected the site for the last of the Air Force's northerly "bare bases", RAAF Scherger, near Weipa on Cape York Peninsula. For his service as CAS, he was raised to a Companion of the Order of Australia on 11 June 1984. On 2 May 1985, he became the first serving member of the ADF to be invited to speak at the National Press Club in Canberra. During his speech he reiterated the need for Australia to acquire an airborne early warning capability to enhance the effectiveness of the soon-to-be-delivered F/A-18 Hornet multirole fighter, declaring that "Jindalee is not sufficient". Later that month two Hornets, whose acquisition Evans had supported while CAFOPS, were handed over to No. 2 Operational Conversion Unit at RAAF Base Williamtown, New South Wales, following a record non-stop flight from Naval Air Station Lemoore in California. Evans had pushed for the long-distance flight, employing a McDonnell Douglas KC-10 tanker to refuel the Hornets in flight, to demonstrate the RAAF's capability and the benefit of tanker aircraft. Six Mirage fighters from No. 77 Squadron intercepted the Hornets and the KC-10 and escorted them to their landing at Williamtown, an action the CAS considered "icing on the cake—a touch of class".

== Later life ==
I had absolutely no compunction in using the word 'elite' in conjunction with the Royal Australian Air Force. It is a force operating at the forefront of aerospace technology, in a medium that is very unforgiving of mistakes.

— Air Marshal Evans at the annual RAAF History Conference, Canberra, 14 October 1992

Evans retired as CAS on 30 May 1985, having flown in excess of 8,600 hours during his RAAF career. He was praised by his successor, Air Marshal Jake Newham, for his "extraordinary zeal and robustness" that helped instil "a renewed sense of pride in the Service". In retirement Evans became a consultant on defence and aviation matters, and wrote and lectured extensively on air power. As a visiting fellow at the Australian National University's Strategic and Defence Studies Centre in 1986, he produced a working paper focussing on the RAAF's concept of operations, Air Operations in Northern Australia. The same year, he was publicly critical of the Federal government's Dibb Report, claiming that while it contained "sensible policy for the defence of Australia", it did not recognise the ADF's offensive capabilities: "People win wars by taking the initiative. In war the aim must be to win. ... If you are a small force you cannot afford to wait, and otherwise you will be defeated." Evans also stood for political office, running as the Liberal candidate for the seat of Eden-Monaro, New South Wales, in the 1987 Australian federal election. He was competing for the conservative vote with National candidate Peter Cochran, whose party advertising was considered to have outperformed the Liberals'. The seat was retained by incumbent Labor member Jim Snow.

In 1990, Evans published his critique of Australian defence policies, A Fatal Rivalry: Australia's Defence at Risk; he followed this in 2000 with War: A Matter of Principles, featuring contributions from senior soldiers and military analysts. Also in 1990, Evans joined the Board of British Aerospace Australia as a non-executive director, and was later appointed senior defence advisor to BAE Systems Australia, retiring in 2009. From 1997 until 2003, he was chairman of the National Capital Authority, and from 1999 until 2003 was national president of the Royal United Services Institute Australia. Evans was patron of several organisations including the Airfield Defence Guards Association, the Royal Australian Air Force Association (ACT Division), The Celtic Club Australia, and the Royal Australian Air Force Staff College Association. He was one of three former members of Australia's Berlin Airlift squadron to be specially honoured by the City of Berlin on the 50th anniversary of the Berlin Blockade in 1998. In January 2001 he was awarded the Centenary Medal for "service to Australian society through Australian Defence Force and to the Canberra community". He was chairman of the 60th Anniversary Victory in the Pacific Steering Committee in 2005. His autobiography, Down to Earth, was launched on 19 July 2011 by former Prime Minister John Howard at Old Parliament House, Canberra. Evans died in Canberra in September 2020, aged 95.

== Notes ==
Military offices
Preceded by Air Marshal Sir Neville McNamara	Chief of the Air Staff; 1982–1985	Succeeded by Air Marshal John Newham
