= Ian Murdoch =

Ian Murdoch may refer to:

- a fictional character in the Conan Doyle story The Adventure of the Lion's Mane
- Ian Murdoch (general), Australian major general, son of Brigadier Thomas Murdoch (engineer), brother of Air Marshal Sir Alister Murdoch
