= Barry Gration =

Ian Barrington Gration
- Born: 30 June 1936 (age 90); Melbourne, Victoria
- Relatives: General Peter Gration (brother)
- Military career
- Allegiance: Australia
- Branch: Royal Australian Air Force
- Service years: 1953–1994
- Rank: Air Marshal
- Commands: Chief of the Air Staff (1992–94); RAAF Air Command (1990–92); RAAF Base Richmond (1980–81); RAAF Base Fairbairn (1975–76)
- Awards: Officer of the Order of Australia; Air Force Cross; Queen's Commendation for Valuable Service in the Air

Air Marshal Ian Barrington "Barry" Gration AO, AFC (born 30 June 1936) is a former senior officer in the Royal Australian Air Force (RAAF), whose career culminated with his appointment as Chief of the Air Staff from 1992 to 1994.

== Early life ==
Gration was born in Melbourne, Victoria, on 30 June 1936 to David Roy Gration and his wife Margaret (née Fleming). David, a dental mechanic, had served in the First World War as a sapper on the Western Front and later enlisted in the Volunteer Defence Corps during the Second World War, discharging with the rank of corporal in 1945. Like his elder brother, Peter, Barry was educated at Scotch College, Melbourne.

== Service career ==
Gration joined the RAAF in 1953, graduating with distinction from RAAF College, Point Cook in 1956 as a pilot officer, General Duties Branch.

He served in a variety of flying and staff appointments from 1957 including a tour as flying instructor. In 1965, Gration graduated from the University of Queensland with a Bachelor of Commerce degree. In June 1970, Squadron Leader Gration was awarded the Air Force Cross for his services to No. 34 Squadron as training officer and VIP captain.

He was subsequently appointed Station Commander at RAAF Base Fairbairn in the Australian Capital Territory, Director of Operations for the Air Force and then Station Commander at RAAF Base Richmond in New South Wales. He went on to be Director General Joint Operations and Plans at Australian Defence Force Headquarters in Canberra and then Head of the Australian Defence Staff and Defence Attaché at the Australian Embassy in Washington D. C.

He was appointed Air Commander Australia in 1990 and Chief of the Air Staff in 1992 before he retired from the RAAF in 1994.

Gration was appointed an Officer of the Order of Australia in 1988. He also holds the Queen's Commendation for Valuable Service in the Air in recognition of his role in flying training and air transport.

His brother General Peter Gration was Chief of the Australian Defence Force.

== Honours and awards ==

Officer of the Order of Australia (AO)	1988
Air Force Cross (AFC)	1970
Centenary Medal	2001
Defence Force Service Medal with Federation Star	for 40+ years of service
National Medal with 1 clasp	for 35 years of service
Australian Defence Medal	2006
Queen's Commendation for Valuable Service in the Air	1966

== Notes ==
Military offices
Preceded by Air Marshal Ray Funnell	Chief of the Air Staff; 1992–1994	Succeeded by Air Marshal Les Fisher
Preceded by Air Vice Marshal Edward Radford	Air Commander Australia; 1990–1992	Succeeded by Air Vice Marshal Gary Beck
