= Neville McNamara =

Royal Australian Air Force and Australian Defence Force chief

Sir Neville McNamara
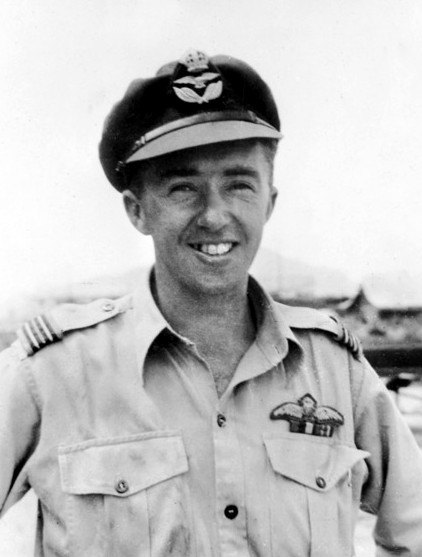
- Flight Lieutenant McNamara in Japan, 1947
- Born: 17 April 1923; Toogoolawah, Queensland
- Died: 7 May 2014 (aged 91); Jervis Bay, New South Wales
- Military career
- Allegiance: Australia
- Branch: Royal Australian Air Force
- Service years: 1941–1984
- Rank: Air Chief Marshal
- Units: Central Flying School (1951–53); No. 77 Squadron (1953)
- Commands: No. 25 Squadron (1957–59); No. 2 OCU (1959–61); RAAF Ubon (1966–67); RAAF Forces Vietnam (1971–72); Chief of the Air Staff (1979–82); Chief of the Defence Force Staff (1982–84)
- Conflicts: World War II; Korean War; Vietnam War
- Awards: Knight Commander of the Order of the British Empire; Officer of the Order of Australia; Air Force Cross; Air Efficiency Award

Air Chief Marshal Sir Neville Patrick McNamara, KBE, AO, AFC, AE (17 April 1923 – 7 May 2014) was a senior commander of the Royal Australian Air Force (RAAF). He served as Chief of the Air Staff (CAS), the RAAF's highest-ranking position, from 1979 until 1982, and as Chief of the Defence Force Staff (CDFS), Australia's top military role at the time, from 1982 until 1984. He was the second RAAF officer to hold the rank of air chief marshal.

Born in Queensland, McNamara joined the RAAF during World War II and saw action in the South West Pacific, flying P-40 Kittyhawks. He also flew combat missions in Gloster Meteors during the Korean War. In 1961, he was awarded the Air Force Cross for his leadership of No. 2 Operational Conversion Unit. He gained further operational experience heading the RAAF presence in Ubon, Thailand, in the late 1960s. Promoted to air commodore, McNamara was Commander RAAF Forces Vietnam, and Deputy Commander Australian Forces Vietnam, in 1971–72, for which he was appointed a Commander of the Order of the British Empire. As Deputy Chief of the Air Staff in 1976, he was named an Officer of the Order of Australia. Knighted while CAS in 1980, he retired after completing his term as CDFS in 1984.

== Early life and World War II ==
Neville Patrick McNamara was born on 17 April 1923 in Toogoolawah, Queensland. He was educated at Toogoolawah State School, and by the Christian Brothers in Warwick and at St. Joseph's Nudgee College. He enlisted in the Royal Australian Air Force (RAAF) on 12 October 1941. Following aircrew training, he graduated as a sergeant pilot on 15 October 1942. He served as an instructor before being posted to the South West Pacific as a fighter pilot with No. 75 Squadron, flying P-40 Kittyhawks. He was commissioned as a pilot officer in the Citizen Air Force on 1 May 1944, and was promoted to flying officer on 1 November.

== Post-war career ==
=== Rise to senior command ===
After the war, McNamara was stationed in Japan with No. 82 Squadron, as part of the British Commonwealth Occupation Force (BCOF). He was promoted to temporary flight lieutenant on 1 May 1946, and received a short-service commission in the Permanent Air Force on 23 September 1948, with the rank of flight lieutenant. In 1949 he was posted to Headquarters North-Eastern Area for air traffic control work. He married Dorothy Miller on 27 May 1950; the couple had two daughters. On 1 September 1950, McNamara was granted a permanent commission in the RAAF. From 1951 to 1953, he served as an instructor at Central Flying School in East Sale, Victoria, gaining promotion to squadron leader on 1 July 1952. He then saw operational service in the Korean War as the Executive Officer of No. 77 Squadron, flying Gloster Meteors. Initially employed in the conflict as a fighter unit, by this time No. 77 Squadron's role was primarily ground attack, using the Meteors' cannon augmented by newly fitted rocket armament. McNamara briefly took charge of the unit in November–December 1953 when there was a hiatus between commanding officers rotating out and rotating in.

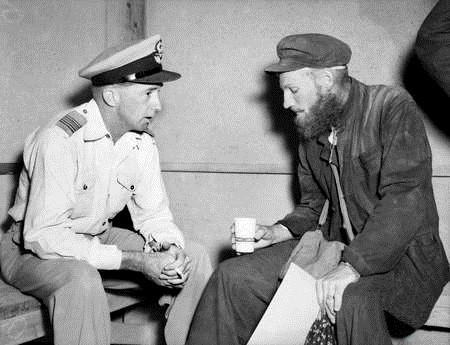
Squadron Leader McNamara (left) as Executive Officer of No. 77 Squadron, talking with Flight Lieutenant John "Butch" Hannan following the latter's release from a North Korean POW camp, Panmunjom, September 1953

Returning to Australia in 1954, McNamara was posted to Headquarters Training Command as pilot training officer. In 1955–56 he served as staff officer fighter operations at the Department of Air, before undertaking training at RAAF Staff College. He was Commanding Officer No. 25 Squadron at Pearce, Western Australia, in 1957–58, receiving promotion to wing commander on 1 July 1957. He took charge of No. 2 Operational Conversion Unit (No. 2 OCU) at RAAF Base Williamtown, New South Wales, in 1959. No. 2 OCU was responsible for training pilots to fly the CAC Sabre jet fighter, which was operated by Nos. 3, 75 and 77 Squadrons. His performance as commanding officer earned him the Air Force Cross in the 1961 Queen's Birthday Honours.

In 1960, McNamara was posted to the UK to attend the Joint Services Staff College. The following year he became CO and senior air staff officer of the RAAF Staff in London. In 1964 he was appointed Director of Personnel (Officers) at the Department of Air. He received the Air Efficiency Award in 1965, and the next year took command of RAAF Ubon, Thailand. Operating under the provisions of the SEATO agreement during the early years of the Vietnam War, the Australian contingent included No. 79 Squadron, flying Sidewinder-equipped CAC Sabres. Although only fifty kilometres from the Laotian border and occasionally scrambled to intercept North Vietnamese fighters, the Sabres never saw action, in contrast to their USAF brethren also based at Ubon. Limited as its military role was, the RAAF presence was judged politically valuable. Completing his tour in Thailand, McNamara served as air staff officer at RAAF Base Richmond, New South Wales, in 1967–68. He was promoted to acting group captain on 5 July 1967 and to the substantive rank the following 1 January. His next appointment was as Director General Organisation at the Department of Air.

=== Senior RAAF and Defence Force command ===
Promoted to acting air commodore on 12 April 1971, McNamara became the last Commander RAAF Forces Vietnam and Deputy Commander Australian Force Vietnam (AFV) that month. Believing that the Air Force paid "lip service" to its army co-operation responsibilities in the 1950s and 1960s, he familiarised himself with the finer points of air/ground operations by accompanying No. 9 Squadron helicopters on missions supporting 1st Australian Task Force in Phuoc Tuy Province. Given the responsibility of overseeing the withdrawal of the RAAF from Vietnam in 1972, McNamara was praised for his "wise and patient counsel, devotion to duty and firm control", leading to his appointment as a Commander of the Order of the British Empire in September that year. He had been promoted to substantive air commodore on 1 January. In 1973, he was posted to the United States as the Australian Air Attache to Washington, D.C. Promoted to air vice marshal on 20 March 1975, he returned to Australia that year and took up duties as the Deputy Chief of Air Staff, which he later described as "an invaluable learning experience for the top job". He was appointed an Officer of the Order of Australia (AO) on 7 June 1976 for "distinguished service in responsible positions".

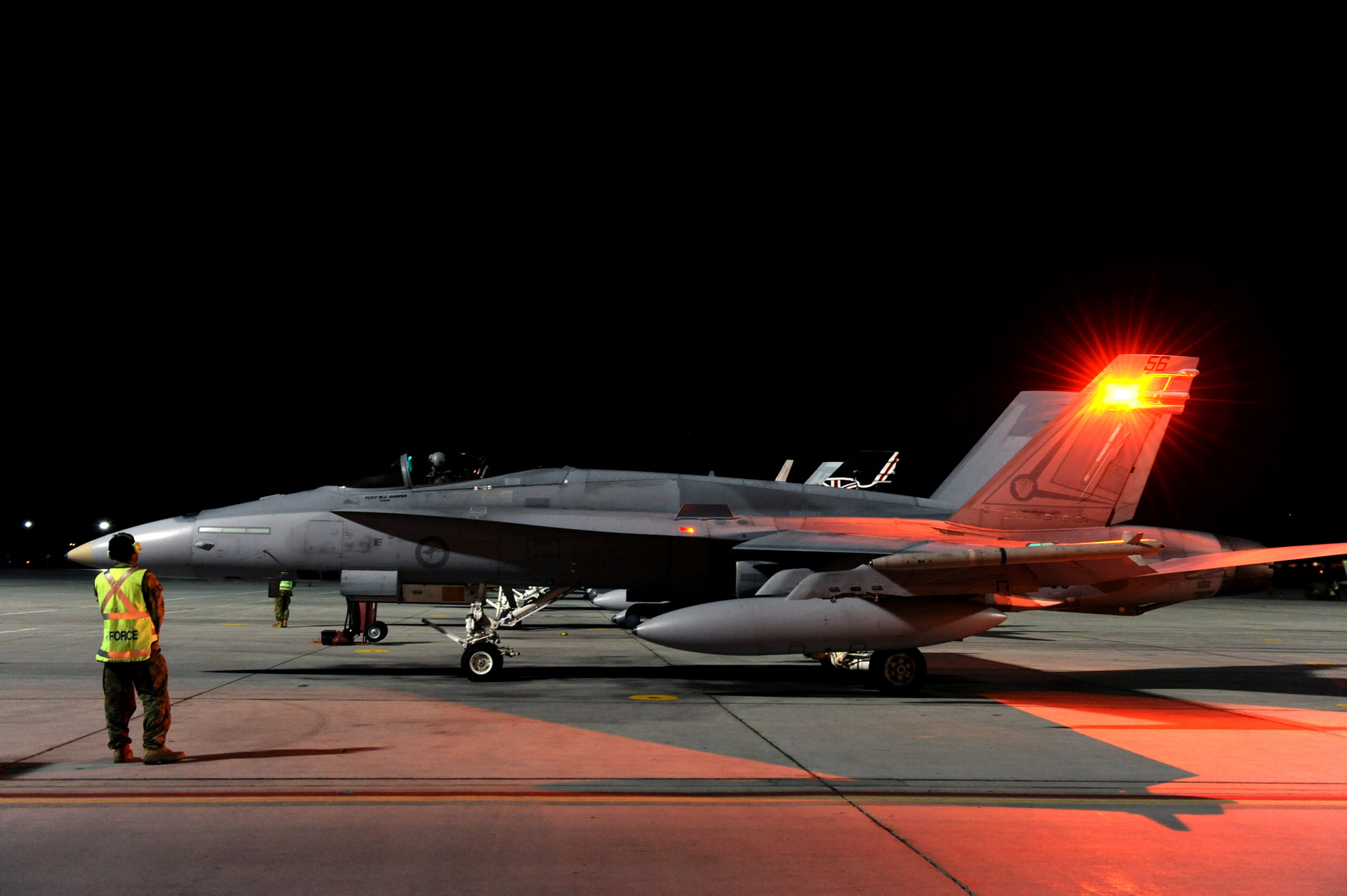
RAAF F/A-18 Hornet, selection of which was overseen by McNamara while Chief of the Air Staff in 1979–82

McNamara was promoted to air marshal and became Chief of the Air Staff (CAS) in March 1979. He succeeded Air Marshal Sir James Rowland, who had been the first CAS to personally command the RAAF in a legal sense, following the abolition of the Australian Air Board in 1976. Previously, the CAS position was more akin to a chairman, "first among equals" with the other members of the Air Board. Under this earlier arrangement, McNamara considered that some senior commanders tended to behave like "regional war lords" who thought that the CAS existed purely to handle politicians and paperwork, while they (the commanders) got on with the Air Force's "real work". As CAS, McNamara put in train development of new strategies for the air defence of Australia, later remarking that "capability must be matched by ideas". He also supervised the selection process that chose the F/A-18 Hornet to the replace the RAAF's Mirage III fighters. McNamara personally favoured the F/A-18 due to its multi-role capability. Appointed a Knight Commander of the Order of the British Empire (KBE) on 31 December 1980, he was the last CAS to be knighted before Australia abandoned the imperial honours system.

In 1982, McNamara became the first Air Force member to directly command all three of Australia's armed services as Chief of the Defence Force Staff (CDFS), which had replaced the earlier senior position in the defence force, Chairman of the Chiefs of Staff Committee. He also became only the second RAAF officer to be raised to the rank of air chief marshal. As CDFS, McNamara had to work to repair strained relations between the Defence Department's military and civilian components. He sought to accomplish this through a restrained management style and respect for the department's public servants. At the same time, he maintained the need for military and civilian personnel to be easily distinguishable, and reversed a trend for armed force personnel to wear suits "in the office" and uniforms only "on parade", which was the preference of Secretary of the Department of Defence Arthur Tange. The military and public service wings of the department still clashed over the question of enlarging the CDFS's role to achieve more coherent defence planning. Shortly after McNamara completed his term as CDFS in 1984, the position was redesignated Chief of the Defence Force (CDF), to more clearly reflect its authority over the Australian armed services.

== Retirement ==
Air Chief Marshal McNamara retired from military life in April 1984. He was awarded the Centenary Medal on 1 January 2001 for his "service to Australian society through the Royal Australian Air Force". That year he joined celebrations at Point Cook, Victoria, to mark the 80th anniversary of the founding of the RAAF. McNamara published his autobiography, The Quiet Man, in 2005. He died at Jervis Bay, New South Wales, on 7 May 2014, and was survived by his wife and two daughters. He is commemorated by Sir Neville McNamara Drive in North Turramurra, New South Wales.

== Notes ==
Military offices
Preceded by Admiral Sir Anthony Synnot	Chief of Defence Force Staff; 1982–1984	Succeeded by General Sir Phillip Bennett
Preceded by Air Marshal Sir James Rowland	Chief of Air Staff; 1979–1982	Succeeded by Air Marshal David Evans
