= Les Fisher =

Leslie Bruce Fisher
- Born: 16 June 1941 (age 85); Parkes, New South Wales
- Military career
- Allegiance: Australia
- Branch: Royal Australian Air Force
- Service years: 1960–1998
- Rank: Air Marshal
- Commands: Chief of Air Force (1994–98); Deputy Chief of the Air Staff (1993–94); Maritime Patrol Group (1987–90); Tactical Transport Group (1987); RAAF Base Townsville (1986–87)
- Awards: Officer of the Order of Australia; Legion of Merit (United States)
- Other work: Deputy chairman Airservices Australia

Air Marshal Leslie Bruce "Les" Fisher AO (born 16 June 1941) is a retired senior officer of the Royal Australian Air Force (RAAF), serving as its Chief from November 1994 until May 1998.

== Early life ==
Fisher was born in Parkes, New South Wales, on 16 June 1941 to Alan Bruce Fisher and his wife Ida May (née Dunford).

== Service career ==
Fisher joined the RAAF in January 1960 and completed navigator training in 1961. Later qualifying as a pilot in 1965, he accumulated more than 5000 hours over four operational flying tours in maritime patrol squadrons.

In 1976 he was posted on exchange duty with the United States Navy at Moffett Field, California as the Plans and Readiness Officer for Commander, Patrol Wings Pacific. For his achievements in the post, he received a letter of Commendation from the United States Secretary of the Navy.

From 1982 until 1986 Fisher served as the Director Joint Planning at the Australian Defence Force Headquarters before being appointed Commander Tactical Transport Group in 1987. He flew the first Orion P-3 from America to Australia.

In recognition of service to the RAAF as Officer Commanding RAAF Base Townsville, Fisher was appointed a Member of the Order of Australia on Australia Day 1988.

Fisher returned to RAAF Base Edinburgh in 1987 as Commander Maritime Patrol Group, and then served as the Commandant Australian Defence Force Warfare Centre between 1990 and 1991. In 1992 he was promoted to the role of Assistant Chief, Defence Force for Operations. Fisher was appointed an Officer of the Order of Australia in the 1993 Queens Birthday Honours List, in recognition of service to the RAAF and the ADF.

In 1993 he was appointed Deputy Chief of the Air Staff and then promoted to air marshal in 1994 on appointment as the Chief of the Air Staff (CAS). Fisher headed the RAAF from 1994 to 1998, served as the last CAS and the first Chief of Air Force (CAF), the change of name occurring in February 1997. Fisher instituted a policy requiring staff to meet minimum physical fitness standards to remain in the service, for the first time in Air Force history. He held the position during a period of significant restructuring until his retirement in 1998. He was awarded the United States Legion of Merit during his time commanding the RAAF.

== Later career ==
Fisher served as the Acting chairman Airservices Australia from 2004, remaining on as Deputy chairman until 2009.

Fisher and Sir Laurence Street reviewed the reformed military justice system following implementation of the 2005 Senate Committee Report into the Effectiveness of Australia's Military Justice System.

Fisher now consults to the aviation industry and government and has been the Chairman of Aerospace Australia since 2002. He is a member of the CAE Australia Advisory Board; a board member of the Aerospace, Maritime and Defence Foundation and the Defence SA Advisory Board in South Australia.

Military offices
Preceded by New creation Replaced position of Chief of the Air Staff	Chief of Air Force; 1997–1998	Succeeded by Air Marshal Errol McCormack
Preceded by Air Marshal Barry Gration	Chief of the Air Staff; 1994–1997	Succeeded by None; Position replaced by Chief of Air Force
Preceded by Air Vice Marshal Thomas O'Brien	Deputy Chief of the Air Staff; 1993–1994	Succeeded by Air Vice Marshal David Rogers
