= Duneed Aboriginal Land Reserve =

On 29 June 1861, the 1-acre (0.40 ha) Duneed Aboriginal Land Reserve was set aside for the Wadawurrung (Wathaurong) people. The reserve was located on Ghazeepore Road just south of Armstrong Creek, in Mount Duneed, Victoria, Australia.

At that time it appears to have had 11 people residing there including Willem Baa Nip. They stayed at the reserve as Aboriginal people were prohibited from staying in the Geelong Township after sundown.

In September 1866, J. M. Garratt reported to the Parliament of Victoria:

"The stores are distributed periodically under the supervision of Mr. Charles Read, my colleague correspondent taking care as much as possible to induce the blacks to go out of town to consume them. Indeed, Mr. Read has supplied one of the neighboring farmers, who appears a trustworthy man, with rations for the use of the natives who camp on and around his homestead, so that they may have as little inducement as possible to visit the town at all. Ten years ago the number of the Geelong blacks was considerable, now only four males remain as a wretched remnant of a once powerful tribe."

On 1 October 1907, its status as an Aboriginal reserve was revoked. The Geelong Advertiser reported at the time of the revocation that it had gone unused for many years.
