= Ray Funnell =

Commander of the Royal Australian Air Force (born 1935)

Raymond George (Ray) Funnell
- Born: 1 March 1935 (age 91); Brisbane, Queensland
- Military career
- Allegiance: Australia
- Branch: Royal Australian Air Force
- Service years: 1953–1992 (39 years)
- Rank: Air Marshal
- Commands: No. 79 Squadron (1966); No. 6 Squadron (1972–1975); Vice Chief of the Defence Force (1986–1987); Chief of the Air Staff (1987–1992)
- Awards: Companion of the Order of Australia; Commander of the Legion of Merit (US)
- Other work: Principal, ACDSS (1994–1998)

Air Marshal Raymond George (Ray) Funnell, AC (born 1 March 1935) is a retired senior commander of the Royal Australian Air Force (RAAF). He served as Chief of the Air Staff (CAS) from 1987 until 1992. A graduate of RAAF College, he began his career flying CAC Sabre jet fighters in Australia and South East Asia in the 1950s and 1960s. From 1972 to 1975 he commanded No. 6 Squadron, during which time the General Dynamics F-111C swing-wing bomber entered Australian service. He held senior staff posts in the early 1980s. In 1986, he was promoted to air marshal and became the inaugural Vice Chief of the Defence Force. Appointed CAS in July 1987, Funnell was closely involved in the development and dissemination of air power doctrine. He retired from the RAAF in October 1992 following his term as CAS, and was founding Principal of the Australian College of Defence and Strategic Studies from 1994 to 1998. Since then he has served on various Federal Government committees on immigration and detention.

== Early career and rise to senior command ==
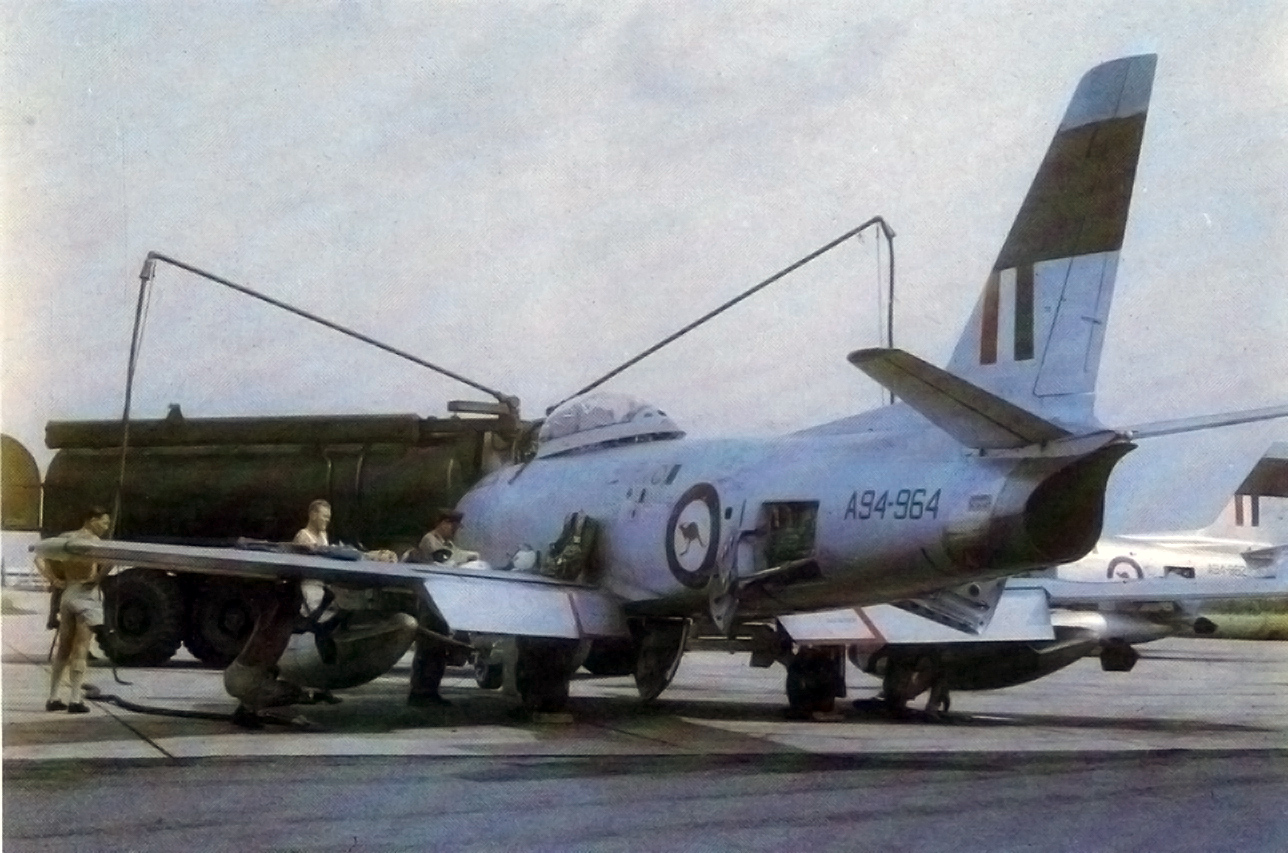
RAAF Sabres in Thailand during the 1960s

Raymond George (Ray) Funnell was born on 1 March 1935 in Brisbane, Queensland, and educated at Brisbane State High School. He joined the Royal Australian Air Force (RAAF) Air Training Corps in January 1949, and received a flying training scholarship. In 1951, aged 16, he learnt to fly with the Royal Queensland Aero Club. In January 1953 he entered RAAF College as an air cadet, graduating with distinction in 1956. He married his wife Suzanne in 1958; the couple had two sons. Funnell spent much of his early career flying CAC Sabre jet fighters at RAAF Bases Williamtown, New South Wales, and Butterworth, Malaysia, as well as Ubon, Thailand, and Labuan, East Malaysia. As a flight lieutenant in the early 1960s, he instructed on the de Havilland Vampire with No. 1 Applied Flying Training School at RAAF Base Pearce, Western Australia. In 1966 he served as commanding officer of No. 79 Squadron at Ubon.

Squadron Leader Funnell attended RAAF Staff College, Canberra, from January to December 1967. He subsequently served in various staff positions with the RAAF and on exchange with the United States Air Force. In 1971 he became the first RAAF officer to attend the US Air War College, and received a master's degree in political science from Auburn University. Promoted to wing commander, from 1972 to 1975 he was commanding officer of No. 6 Squadron at RAAF Base Amberley, Queensland. His tenure witnessed the introduction of the General Dynamics F-111C swing-wing bomber to Australian service. On 8/9 April 1974, Funnell flew an F-111 around Australia to commemorate the 1924 circumnavigation of the continent by Wing Commander Stanley Goble and Flight Lieutenant Ivor McIntyre in a Fairey III seaplane. From 1975 to 1978 he was head of the Military Planning Staff for the Australian Defence Force Academy project. He also served as honorary aide-de-camp to Governor-General Sir John Kerr. Funnell was awarded the National Medal for long service in 1977, and a clasp the following year.

== Senior command ==
Promoted to air commodore, Funnell was appointed Chief of Staff at Headquarters Operational Command in Glenbrook, New South Wales, in 1979. He attended the Royal College of Defence Studies, London, in 1981 and the following year was appointed Director-General of the Military Staff Branch in the Department of Defence, Canberra. In November 1983 he was promoted air vice marshal and became Chief of Air Force Operations and Plans. He was appointed an Officer of the Order of Australia (AO) on 10 June 1985. The same year, he took up the position of Assistant Chief of the Defence Force (Policy). On 6 June 1986, he was promoted to air marshal and appointed the first Vice Chief of the Defence Force; the role made him responsible for Australian Defence Force policy and planning, as well as operations.

The study and knowledge of air power must be the central element of the RAAF's corporate intellect.

— Air Marshal Funnell, 1989.

On 3 July 1987, Funnell succeeded Air Marshal Jake Newham as Chief of the Air Staff (CAS), becoming the first graduate of RAAF College to attain the position; he was also the first incumbent to possess a master's degree. Known for his intellectual curiosity and commitment to the study of air warfare, Funnell ordered the establishment in 1989 of a permanent think-tank and educational institution, the Air Power Studies Centre (later the Air Power Development Centre), and donated the R.G. Funnell library to RAAF Staff College. The Air Power Manual, the RAAF's first self-produced treatise on aerial war fighting, was completed by a development team sponsored by Funnell, and published in 1990. Funnell also championed the publication of The Decisive Factor, based on the writings of Air Vice Marshal Henry Wrigley, who was credited with laying the foundations for the RAAF's modern air power doctrine.

As CAS, Funnell focused on turning the RAAF into the "air power element of a cohesive, integrated defence force". His tenure saw the continuation of a shift in the RAAF's 'centre of gravity' from the south to the north of Australia. RAAF Base Curtin, in North Western Australia, and RAAF Base Tindal, in the Northern Territory, were opened and development proceeded on RAAF Base Scherger in Far North Queensland. At the same time, bases in the south, including Point Cook, Laverton and support units in capital cities, were rationalised. The Air Force was in the process of re-equipping its Mirage III fighter squadrons with the F/A-18 Hornet when Funnell became CAS, and he had to contend with a shortage of pilots that was exacerbated by the extra training time required for the new aircraft. In September 1988, he flew one of the RAAF's recently acquired Pilatus PC-9 turboprop trainers in the Bicentenary Round Australia Air Race. He considered it fitting that the CAS should make the journey, as Stanley Goble had held the same position when he circumnavigated Australia for the first time in 1924. His term coincided with the 1990–91 Gulf War; the RAAF's contribution included transporting Australian hostages and medical staff from the Middle East. Funnell was appointed a Companion of the Order of Australia (AC) on 12 June 1989 for his service as CAS, and awarded the US Commander of the Legion of Merit in 1991.

== Later life ==
Funnell retired from the RAAF following completion of his term as CAS on 1 October 1992, and was succeeded by Air Marshal Barry Gration, one of his classmates from the 1953 intake at RAAF College. Funnell's five-year term as CAS was the longest since that of Air Marshal George Jones, who served ten years in the post from 1942 to 1952. In 1993, Funnell became Director of the National Defence College project. From 1994 until 1998, he served as the inaugural Principal of the Australian College of Defence and Strategic Studies, which subsequently evolved into the Australian Defence College. He became a consultant in 1999, and was awarded the Centenary Medal for "humanitarian and defence services" on 1 January 2001. From 2001 to 2009, he was a member of the Minister's Advisory Council on People Smuggling, and the Immigration Detention Advisory Group (IDAG). He publicly disavowed the Australian contribution to the 2003 invasion of Iraq but, once battle was joined, opposed the withdrawal of troops and cautioned against anti-war demonstrations. Funnell served as Deputy Chair of the Council for Immigration Services and Status Resolution (CISSR) from 2009 to 2011, and became Deputy Chair of the Federal Minister's Council on Asylum Seekers and Detention (MCASD) in 2012. His recreational activities include motorcycling, photography, walking and bicycling.

== Notes ==
Military offices
| Preceded by Air Marshal John Newham | Chief of the Air Staff; 1987–1992 | Succeeded by Air Marshal Barry Gration |
| New office | Vice Chief of the Defence Force; 1986–1987 | Succeeded by Vice Admiral Ian Knox |
