= Alister Murdoch =

Royal Australian Air Force air marshal

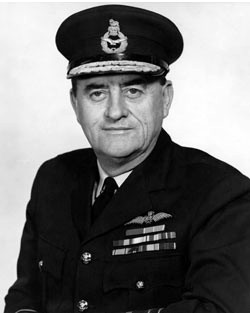
- Official RAAF portrait of Air Marshal Murdoch
- Born: 9 December 1912; Elsternwick, Victoria
- Died: 24 October 1984 (aged 71); Mona Vale, New South Wales
- Military career
- Allegiance: Australia
- Branch: Royal Australian Air Force
- Service years: 1929–1969
- Rank: Air Marshal
- Units: North-Western Area Command (1944–45); First Tactical Air Force (1945)
- Commands: No. 1 Air Observer School (1940–41); No. 221 Squadron RAF (1941–42); RAAF College (1952–53); Training Command (1953–56); Operational Command (1962–65); Chief of the Air Staff (1965–69)
- Conflicts: World War II; European Theatre; Battle of the Atlantic; Dieppe Raid; Middle East Theatre; South West Pacific Theatre; Battle of North Borneo; Battle of Balikpapan; Vietnam War
- Awards: Knight Commander of the Order of the British Empire; Companion of the Order of the Bath; Mentioned in Despatches

Air Marshal Sir Alister Murray Murdoch, KBE, CB (9 December 1912 – 24 October 1984) was a senior commander in the Royal Australian Air Force (RAAF). He served as Chief of the Air Staff (CAS) from 1965 to 1969. Joining the Air Force in 1930, Murdoch trained as a seaplane pilot and participated in an Antarctic rescue mission for lost explorers in 1935. During World War II, he commanded No. 221 Squadron RAF in Europe and the Middle East, and later occupied senior positions on the staff of RAAF formations in the South West Pacific. His post-war appointments included Commandant of RAAF College from 1952 to 1953, Air Officer Commanding (AOC) Training Command from 1953 to 1955, Deputy Chief of the Air Staff from 1958 to 1959, and AOC Operational Command from 1962 to 1965.

As AOC Training Command in 1954, Murdoch headed a program to determine aircraft purchases for the RAAF; his recommendations included the C-130 Hercules transport, considered one of the most important acquisitions in the Air Force's history. His term as CAS coincided with an increased commitment to the Vietnam War, and he came into conflict with Australian Army commanders over the employment of helicopters in battle. He was also involved in assessing the readiness of the General Dynamics F-111C for RAAF service. Appointed a Companion of the Order of the Bath in 1960 and Knight Commander of the Order of the British Empire in 1966, Murdoch was the fourth in a series of CASs who had been cadets at the Royal Military College, Duntroon. He retired from the Air Force in December 1969 and died in 1984.

== Early career ==
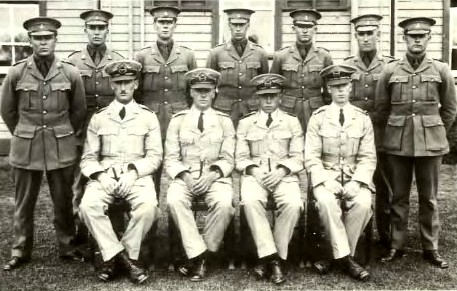
Cadet Murdoch (far right) with other former students of the Royal Military College, Duntroon, transferred to the RAAF in December 1930

Alister Murray Murdoch was born on 9 December 1912 in Elsternwick, Victoria, the son of engineer Thomas Murdoch and his wife Kathleen. A lieutenant in the Commonwealth Military Forces at the time of Alister's birth, Thomas was awarded the Distinguished Service Order in World War I, and rose to the rank of brigadier as Director-General of Engineer Services in World War II. Educated at Caulfield Grammar School, Alister entered the Royal Military College, Duntroon, in 1929, following his elder brother Ian (later a major general). Alister was one of four cadets sponsored that year by the Royal Australian Air Force (RAAF), which did not at that stage have its own officer training college. Budgetary constraints imposed during the Great Depression necessitated the transfer of these cadets out of Duntroon midway through their four-year course. Although offered positions in the Australian Public Service or nominations for short-term commissions with the Royal Air Force, all were determined to serve with the RAAF and were more than pleased with the prospect of entering their chosen service early.

Murdoch enlisted in the Air Force on 10 December 1930, and completed his pilot training the following year. He was commissioned in 1932 and later qualified as a flying instructor and seaplane pilot, undertaking navy cooperation and maritime patrol operations. In December 1935, Flying Officer Murdoch was selected to join an RAAF rescue mission for explorer Lincoln Ellsworth and his pilot, Herbert Hollick-Kenyon, who were presumed lost while journeying across the Antarctic. Flying a de Havilland Gipsy Moth, Murdoch located Hollick-Kenyon near the Bay of Whales. Hollick-Kenyon led the search party to Ellsworth, who protested that he was not lost and did not need rescuing. Murdoch was posted to England in 1936–37 to undertake a course in long navigation at RAF Manston and serve on attachment with No. 114 Squadron. Returning to Australia, he married Florence Miller on 27 December 1937; the couple had a daughter. Murdoch spent the next two years on the staff of the Directorate of Operations and Intelligence at Air Force Headquarters, Melbourne. In June 1938, he helped inaugurate RAAF instruction in long navigation with a nine-month course in the discipline.

== World War II ==
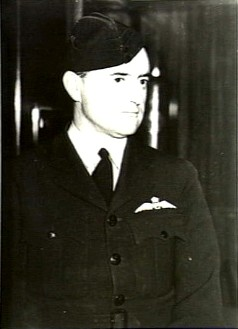
Murdoch preparing to embark overseas, June 1941

Ranked squadron leader at the outbreak of World War II, Murdoch took charge of No. 1 Air Observer School at Cootamundra, New South Wales, from April 1940 until mid-1941. Following this posting he was promoted to wing commander and sent to the European Theatre. In August 1941, he became commanding officer of No. 221 Squadron RAF, a Coastal Command unit flying Vickers Wellingtons on reconnaissance and anti-submarine patrols out of Iceland during the Battle of the Atlantic. The next year, Murdoch accompanied the squadron to the Middle East, where it carried out anti-submarine and maritime strike operations. He also served as staff officer operations with No. 235 Wing RAF. Back in London in July 1942, Murdoch was assigned to Combined Operations Headquarters, where he assisted in planning the Dieppe Raid before returning to Australia in 1943.

Promoted to group captain, Murdoch was appointed senior air staff officer (SASO) at Eastern Area Command, Sydney, in July 1943. In January 1944, he became SASO at North-Western Area Command, which controlled thirteen Australian, British, Dutch, and American squadrons from its headquarters in Darwin, Northern Territory. Murdoch planned many of the command's bombing and mining operations in the South West Pacific Theatre, and was mentioned in despatches for his "distinguished service" in the role. He was posted as SASO to the Australian First Tactical Air Force (No. 1 TAF) in April 1945, replacing Group Captain William Gibson after the latter's dismissal in the wake of the "Morotai Mutiny", when the threatened resignations of eight of the RAAF's leading fighter aces caused a crisis in the formation's leadership. Delegated operational responsibility by No. 1 TAF's new commander, Air Commodore Frederick Scherger, Murdoch received much of the credit for the planning of the RAAF's role in Operation Oboe Six, the invasion of Labuan. He accompanied Scherger ashore on the afternoon of the landings on 10 June 1945. Murdoch was also praised for his staff work during Operation Oboe Two, the Battle of Balikpapan, in July.

== Post-war career ==
=== Rise to Chief of the Air Staff ===
Murdoch was appointed a Commander of the Order of the British Empire (CBE) on 25 June 1946 for "conspicuous service in operations against the Japanese" during World War II. One of a small coterie of officers earmarked for top positions in the post-war Air Force, he was Director of Personnel Services in 1946–47 before attending the Imperial Defence College, London, in 1948. Returning to Australia, he served as Director of Air Staff Policy and Plans at Air Force Headquarters between 1949 and 1952. In February 1951, he led a team to the Middle East, where the possibility of Australia contributing a garrison force to the region was first raised. Two years later, No. 78 Wing was deployed to Malta to fulfil this role, operating leased RAF de Havilland Vampire jet fighters. Murdoch became Commandant of RAAF College in June 1952, gaining promotion to air commodore. In December 1953, he was raised to acting air vice marshal and appointed Air Officer Commanding (AOC) Training Command.

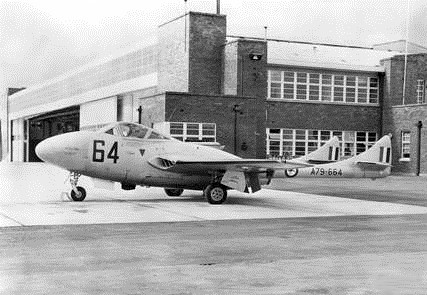
Australian-built Vampire T35; sixty-nine were delivered to the RAAF following Murdoch's recommendation for a jet trainer in 1954

In 1954, Murdoch led a mission to examine potential new fighter, bomber, transport, and training aircraft for the RAAF, following a shift in defence funding towards the Air Force. He advocated the F-104 Starfighter as a replacement for the CAC Sabre, two years before the Sabre entered squadron service with the RAAF, as well as nuclear-capable British V bomber strike aircraft to augment Australia's Canberra jet bombers, and C-130 Hercules transports to replace the C-47 Dakota. Although his proposals for V bombers and the F-104 were not taken up, the Australian government acquired the C-130 in 1958. Described in the official history of the post-war Air Force as second only to the General Dynamics F-111 as the "most significant" purchase by the RAAF, the Hercules gave Australia its first strategic airlift capability, which in years to come would provide a "lifeline" for forces deployed to Malaya, Vietnam, and other parts of South East Asia. Murdoch also recommended the locally built Vampire as a jet trainer for No. 1 Applied Flying Training School; sixty-nine were later delivered as T35s by the de Havilland factory in Bankstown, New South Wales.

Murdoch was seconded to the Department of Defence in January 1956 as Deputy Secretary (Military). By February 1958, he had been made a substantive air vice-marshal and appointed Deputy Chief of the Air Staff. In October 1959, Murdoch was posted to London as Head of the Australian Joint Services Staff, and appointed a Companion of the Order of the Bath (CB) in the 1960 New Year Honours. He returned to Australia in June 1962, when he became AOC Operational Command. His tenure in the position coincided with the deployment of the first RAAF aircraft to South Vietnam, seven DHC-4 Caribous, commencing in August 1964. Murdoch was promoted air marshal and appointed Chief of the Air Staff (CAS) on 1 June 1965, succeeding Air Marshal Sir Valston Hancock. He was the last of a quartet of army-trained CASs; from 1954 to 1969 inclusive, every RAAF chief—John McCauley, Scherger, Hancock, and Murdoch—had been a cadet at the Royal Military College, Duntroon, before serving with the Air Force. With this pedigree, Murdoch was described by Air Chief Marshal Scherger as "the last of the professionals". The new CAS was raised to Knight Commander of the Order of the British Empire (KBE) in the 1966 Queen's Birthday Honours.

=== Chief of the Air Staff and Vietnam ===
Air Marshal Murdoch led the RAAF through the build-up of Australia's commitment to the Vietnam War beginning in the mid-1960s. He clashed with the Chief of the General Staff (CGS), Lieutenant General Sir John Wilton, over the latter's recommendation in mid-1965 to deploy two UH-1 Iroquois helicopters to Vietnam. Wilton believed that both services would benefit from gaining familiarisation with air/ground operations in the region before the large-scale commitment of Australian forces. Murdoch dismissed the idea on resourcing grounds, despite the fact that two thirds of the RAAF's UH-1 complement had been purchased for the express purpose of army cooperation. He further contended that helicopter operations in Malaysia had afforded the RAAF sufficient experience in the type of conditions they might face in Vietnam, though Australia's senior UH-1 pilot at the time considered that the former theatre offered "little if any hostile opposition, and there was none of the insertion and extraction of SAS patrols which was to become such an important part of the RAAF's Vietnam operations". Air Commodore Brian Eaton, as Director-General of Operational Requirements, advised Murdoch that if the Air Force did not more fully satisfy the ground support requirements of the Army, then the Army itself would seek to take control of this sphere of operations, undermining the RAAF's position as the main provider of Australia's air power. Murdoch's reluctance to deploy the helicopters was eventually overridden by the Australian government, and No. 9 Squadron's UH-1s were in action in Vietnam less than a year later. When Murdoch visited the combat zone himself in August 1966, he was informed by Brigadier David Jackson that the squadron was not performing the role the Army expected of it.

As early as 1965 the Army had signalled its thoughts on the desirability of helicopter support for 1RAR in Vietnam and received a cold rebuff from the RAAF. The Chief of Air Staff at the time, Air Marshal Murdoch, may have been justified in terms of resource allocation for the stance he took, but the terms in which he rejected the Army's suggestion were tactless at best.

— Chris Coulthard-Clark, military historian

Wilton's successor as CGS, Lieutenant General Sir Thomas Daly, urged Murdoch to procure specialised helicopter gunships such as the AH-1 HueyCobra for Vietnam, to support the more vulnerable troop-carrying "slicks". Murdoch largely ignored the suggestion, telling his staff to treat the Army's recommendation with a lesser priority than "anything we now have on our 'shopping list'". His preference was for V/STOL fixed-wing aircraft like the Harrier jump jet, which he thought would open a "new era in close support aircraft". In the event, the Federal government earmarked eleven AH-1G HueyCobras for purchase in 1971, though the deal never went ahead due to Australia's withdrawal from South East Asia. Murdoch's failure to appreciate the need for cooperation with land forces has been blamed for fostering long-running enmity between the services, which twenty years later would contribute to the government's decision to transfer the RAAF's battlefield helicopters to the Army. Air Force historian Alan Stephens contended that despite Murdoch's "competence" and "good mind", his "comprehension of air power in its fullest sense and handling of inter-service politics were respectively inadequate and disastrous ... A generation of lieutenant-colonels and majors had come to believe that the RAAF did not care about army support, and they were to carry that belief into the 1970s and beyond". Murdoch also opposed sending Canberra jet bombers to Vietnam on what were later described in the official post-war history of the RAAF as "misleading" grounds that the type was unsuitable for a low-level strike and close support; their deployment went ahead in April 1967.

In 1963, Australia had selected the F-111 swing-wing bomber as a replacement for the Canberra. Murdoch attended the much-anticipated official hand-over ceremony for the aircraft on 4 September 1968 at Fort Worth, Texas, with Defence Minister Sir Allen Fairhall, US dignitaries, and RAAF F-111 crews. Within eight days a US Navy F-111B crashed, followed by a USAF F-111A twelve days later, creating a "public relations disaster", and contributing to the type's entry into RAAF service being delayed until 1973. In late 1969, Murdoch accompanied Secretary of Defence Sir Henry Bland to the United States to gain assurance of an adequate "safe life" for the F-111's swing-wing mechanism, amid the Australian government giving serious consideration to abandoning the program.

== Later life ==
Murdoch retired from the military on 31 December 1969 after completing his term as CAS, which the government had extended for a further twelve months beyond its original three years. He was succeeded by Air Marshal Colin Hannah, whom Murdoch had earlier recommended for the position of Commander Australian Forces Vietnam (the role went to an Army officer, as had been previous practice). In 1971, Murdoch joined the board of directors of Meggitt Limited, an oilseed-crushing firm that was chaired by World War II fighter ace Nicky Barr. Murdoch continued to exercise his interest in Australia's defence after he left the Air Force, joining in 1975 a group of pundits, including retired Air Vice Marshal Ian McLachlan, who promoted augmenting the country's arsenal with nuclear weaponry. He also followed sport, including horse racing. Murdoch died in Mona Vale, New South Wales, on 24 October 1984, and was cremated.

== See also ==
- List of Caulfield Grammar School people

== Notes ==
Military offices
Preceded by Frank Headlam	Air Officer Commanding HQ Operational Command; 1962–1965	Succeeded by Colin Hannah
Preceded by Sir Valston Hancock	Chief of the Air Staff; 1965–1969	Succeeded by Colin Hannah
