= No. 3 Squadron RAAF =

Royal Australian Air Force squadron

- No. 3 Squadron's crest
- Active: 1916–1919; 1925–1946; 1948–1953; 1956–current
- Country: Australia
- Branch: Royal Australian Air Force
- Role: Multi-role fighter
- Part of: No. 81 Wing, Air Combat Group
- Garrison/HQ: RAAF Base Williamtown
- Mottos: Operta Aperta ("Secrets Revealed")
- Engagements: World War I: Western Front; World War II: Western Desert Campaign; Syria–Lebanon Campaign; Tunisia Campaign; Italian Campaign; Cold War: Malayan Emergency; Indonesia–Malaysia Konfrontasi; Military intervention against ISIL

Commanders
- Notable commanders: David Blake (1916–1918); Bill Anderson (1918–1919); Henry Wrigley (1919); Frank Lukis (1925–1930); Harry Cobby (1930–1931); Bill Bostock (1931–1936); Allan Walters (1938–1939); Ian McLachlan (1939–1941); Peter Jeffrey (1941); Alan Rawlinson (1941); Bobby Gibbes (1942–1943); Brian Eaton (1943–1944); Vance Drummond (1967); Jake Newham (1967–1968); Richard Bomball (1973–1974); Geoff Brown (1997–2000)

Aircraft flown
- Fighter: F-35A Lightning II

No. 3 Squadron is a Royal Australian Air Force (RAAF) fighter squadron, headquartered at RAAF Base Williamtown, near Newcastle, New South Wales. Established in 1916, it was one of four combat squadrons of the Australian Flying Corps during World War I, and operated on the Western Front in France before being disbanded in 1919. It was re-established as a permanent squadron of the RAAF in 1925, and during World War II operated in the Mediterranean Theatre. The Cold War years saw the squadron disbanded and re-raised twice. It was based at RAAF Butterworth during the Malayan Emergency and the Indonesia–Malaysia Konfrontasi. Equipped with McDonnell Douglas F/A-18 Hornet multi-role fighters from 1986, the squadron deployed to Diego Garcia in 2002 to provide local air defence, and the following year contributed aircraft and crews to the invasion of Iraq as part of Operation Falconer. In April 2016, it deployed to the Middle East as part of the military intervention against ISIL. The squadron began re-equipping with Lockheed Martin F-35 Lightning II multi-role fighters in 2018.

== History ==
=== World War I ===
No. 3 Squadron was formed at Point Cook, Victoria, on 19 September 1916 under the command of Major David Blake. It was one of four operational squadrons of the Australian Flying Corps, and its personnel were members of the Australian Army. Shortly afterwards, the unit embarked upon HMAT Ulysses and sailed to England for training, before becoming the first AFC squadron deployed to France, in September 1917, equipped with the R.E.8 two-seat reconnaissance/general purpose aircraft. To avoid confusion with the British No. 3 Squadron RFC, it was known to the British military as "No. 69 Squadron RFC". This terminology was never accepted by the squadron or the Australian Imperial Force who continued to use the AFC designation regardless, and in early 1918, the British designation was dropped.

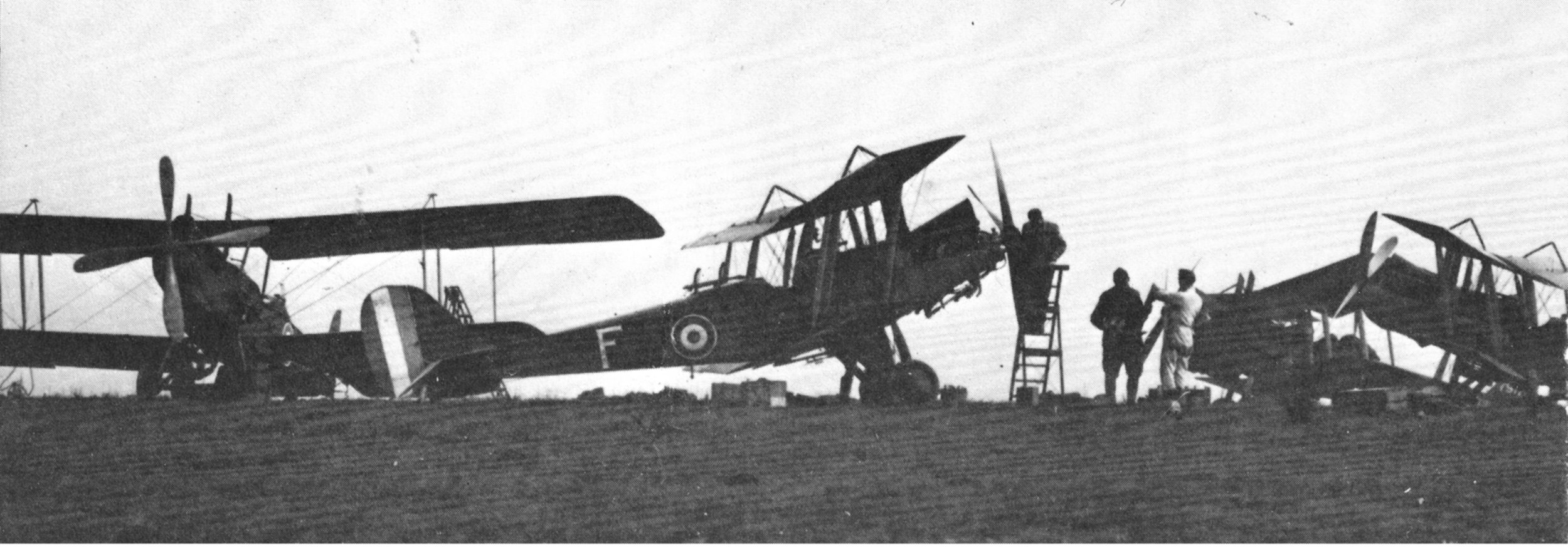
R.E.8s of No 3 Sqn AFC

After moving to the Western Front, the squadron was initially based at Savy. In November 1917 it was assigned the role of a corps reconnaissance squadron and allocated to I Anzac Corps, which was based around Messines, and established itself at Bailleul. No. 3 Squadron would remain with I Anzac for the remainder of the war, and participated in bombing, artillery spotting and reconnaissance missions supporting ANZAC and other British Empire ground forces. Its first air-to-air victory came on 6 December 1917; by the end of the war its aircrews had been credited with another 15 German aircraft, and a total of 10,000 operational hours.

In early 1918 the collapse of Russia allowed the Germans to concentrate their strength on the Western Front, and launched a major offensive. As the Allies were pushed back, the squadron's airfield at Baileul came into range of the German guns and it was moved first to Abeele and then, as the Allies were pushed back further, it moved again to Poulainville. During the offensive, the squadron operated mainly in the Somme Valley, providing artillery observation. In April 1918 the squadron became responsible for the remains of the "Red Baron", Manfred von Richthofen, after he was shot down in its sector. Blake initially believed that one of the squadron's R.E.8s may have been responsible but later endorsed the theory that an Australian anti-aircraft machine gunner actually shot down the Red Baron. In July the squadron undertook reconnaissance and deception operations in support of the Australian attack at Hamel, before later joining the final Allied offensive of the war around Amiens in August, flying support operations until the armistice in November. Shortly before the end of the war, the squadron began converting to the Bristol F.2 Fighter.

Following the end of hostilities the squadron was engaged briefly in mail transport duties before being withdrawn to the United Kingdom in early 1919. It was disbanded in February and over the course of the next couple of months its personnel were repatriated back to Australia. Casualties amounted to 32 killed and 23 wounded, of which the majority were aircrew; the squadron lost 11 aircraft during the war.

=== 1925–1939 ===
In 1925, the squadron was re-formed as part of the fledgling independent Royal Australian Air Force. Under the command of Squadron Leader Frank Lukis, it was based initially at Point Cook and then at Richmond, operating aircraft including S.E.5As, DH.9s, Westland Wapitis and Hawker Demons.

=== World War II ===
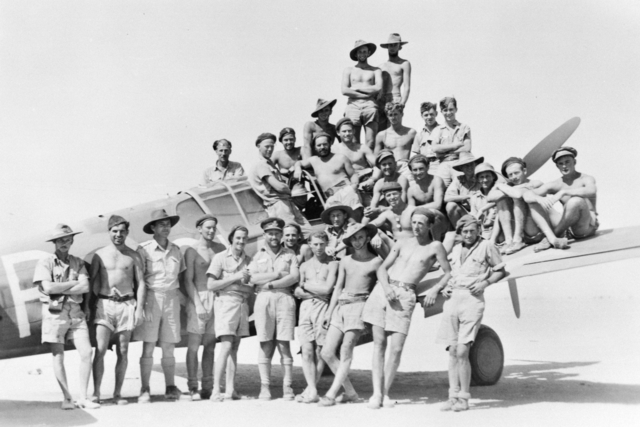
No. 3 Squadron ground crew in front of a P-40 in 1942.

At the outbreak of World War II, the squadron was one of 12 permanent RAAF squadrons. It was initially given an army co-operation role, and was deployed to the Middle East in mid-1940, to support the 6th Division of the Australian Army. The squadron was to spend the entire war in the Mediterranean theatre, and became part of the Allies' Desert Air Force (later the First Tactical Air Force), supporting the 8th Army.

Commanded by Squadron Leader Ian McLachlan, the squadron's personnel travelled by sea to Egypt, where it was to be provided with aircraft from RAF stocks. Initially, it used two obsolete biplane types, the Gloster Gauntlet and Gloster Gladiator, for close air support, along with the Westland Lysander, for reconnaissance sorties, against Italian forces in Egypt and Libya. In the course of these operations, the squadron clashed with aircraft from the Regia Aeronautica. It then, briefly, operated the Hawker Hurricane instead, before converting to the Curtiss P-40B/C Tomahawk in 1941. It saw action against Vichy French aircraft during the Syria–Lebanon campaign.

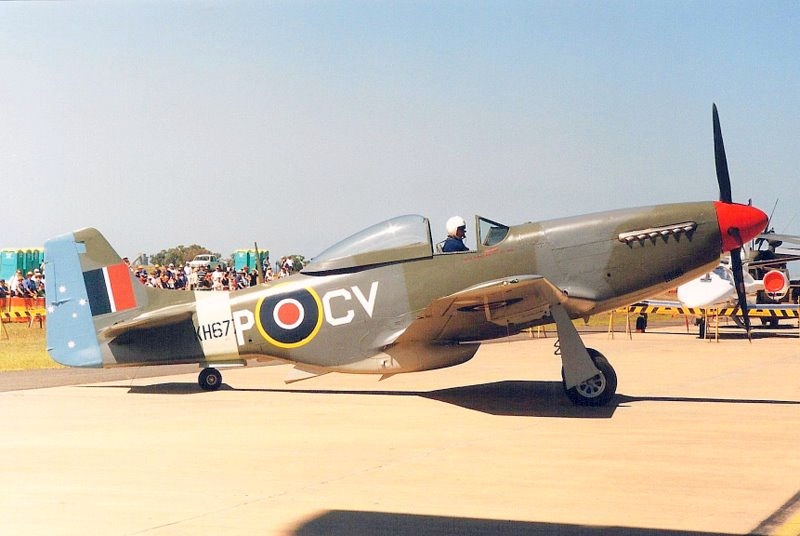
A CAC CA-18 Mustang painted to represent a North American P-51 Mustang of No. 3 Squadron used in Italy during World War II

With the Tomahawk and its successor, the Kittyhawk (P-40D – P-40N), the squadron returned to the North African campaign, during which it often engaged in intense air battles with state of the art fighters operated by the Reggia Aeronautica (such as the Macchi C.202) and German Luftwaffe (Messerschmitt Bf 109E/F), during 1941–1943. There is evidence that 3 Sqn was the DAF Kittyhawk squadron that attacked German ground forces at Mezzouna, Tunisia, on 3 April 1943 and caused, in the process, severe injuries to Claus Von Stauffenberg (who would, the following year, attempt to assassinate Adolf Hitler, as part of a failed coup against the Nazi regime).

No. 3 Squadron's longest-serving commanding officer (CO) during the war was Squadron Leader Bobby Gibbes, whose tour lasted from February 1942 to April 1943. Gibbes was replaced by Squadron Leader Brian Eaton, who led the unit until February 1944. No. 3 Squadron took part in the Allied invasion of Sicily and the Allied invasion of Italy. It re-equipped with P-51 Mustangs in November 1944 and continued to operate in Italy and Yugoslavia until the end of the European war in May 1945. No. 3 Squadron's record of 25,663 operational flight hours and 217.5 enemy aircraft destroyed made it the highest-scoring RAAF fighter squadron.

=== Cold War ===
At the end of the war, No. 3 Squadron returned to Australia and disbanded at Point Cook on 30 July 1946. It was re-formed at RAAF Base Fairbairn in Canberra in early 1948 when No. 4 Squadron RAAF was renumbered as No. 3 Squadron. Equipped with Mustangs, CAC Wirraways and Austers, the squadron served briefly as a tactical reconnaissance and close support squadron before disbanding again in 1953. The squadron re-formed on 1 March 1956 at RAAF Base Williamtown, New South Wales. It operated CA-27 Sabres out of Butterworth, Malaya, from 1958 engaging in warlike operations associated with the Malayan Emergency and Konfrontasi.

As Australian involvement in the Vietnam War intensified, No. 3 Squadron returned to Australia and re-equipped with Mirage IIIO fighters at Williamtown in 1967. The CO, Wing Commander Vance Drummond, was killed during air combat manoeuvres at No. 2 Operational Conversion Unit in May. He was succeeded by Wing Commander Jake Newham (later Chief of the Air Staff). After training in air-to-air and air-to-ground roles, the squadron deployed to RAAF Butterworth in Malaysia in February 1969, detachments were also deployed to RAF Tengah and Paya Lebar Air Base. During this period, the aircraft became known as "lizards", in reference to their camouflage paint scheme and low altitude operations. The frill neck lizard was adopted as an informal squadron insignia.

After 15 years deployed to Malaysia, No. 3 Squadron returned to Australia, and after transferring aircraft and personnel to No. 79 Squadron, on 29 August 1986 No. 3 Squadron became the first operational RAAF unit to receive F/A-18 Hornets.

=== Post-Cold War ===
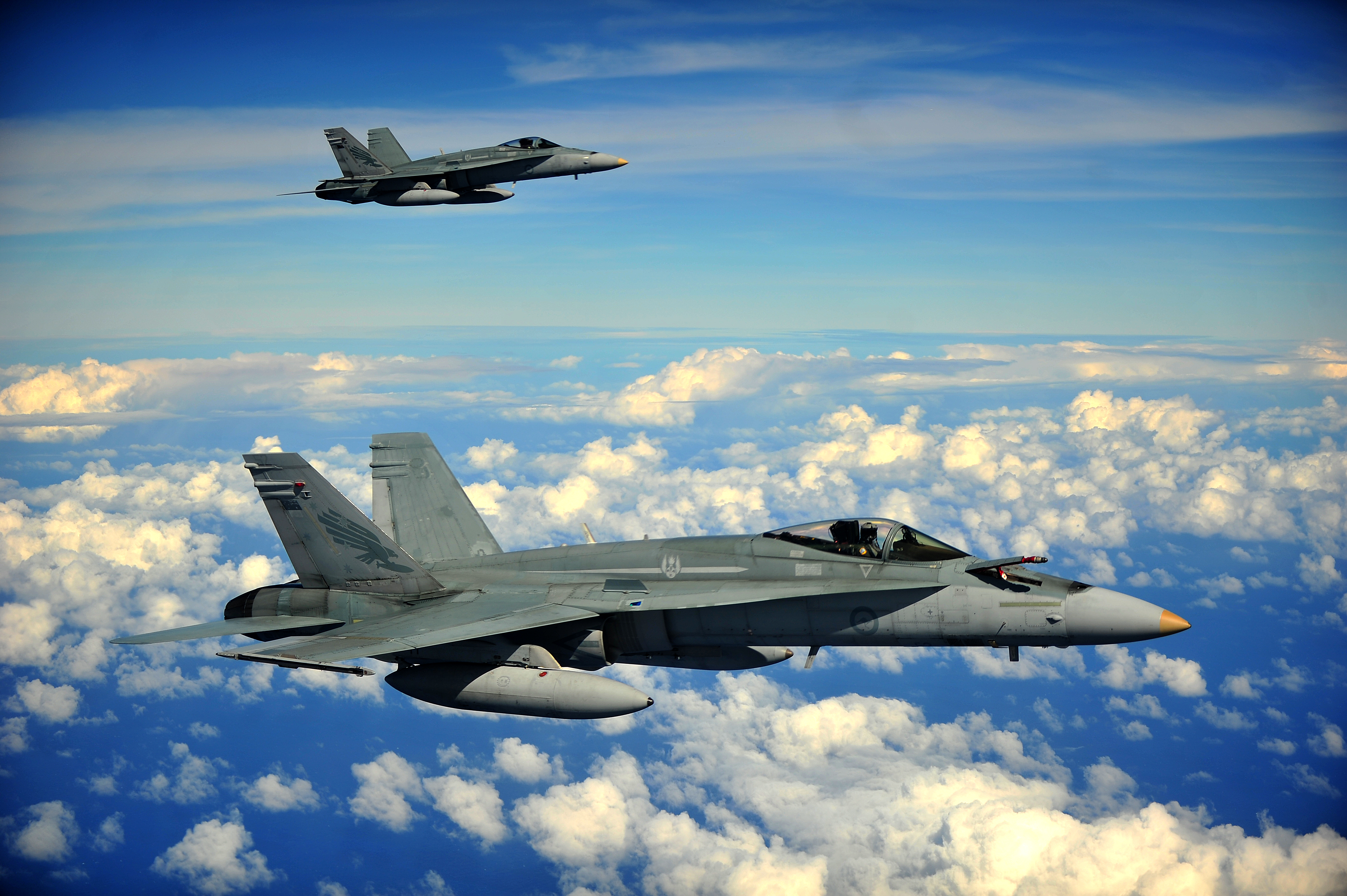
Two No. 3 Squadron Hornets in 2013

The squadron continues to operate the Hornets from its home base at RAAF Base Williamtown. In February 2002, during the Afghanistan War, elements of No. 3 Squadron were deployed to Diego Garcia, in the Indian Ocean, to relieve No. 77 Squadron, providing air defence for the Coalition base there. No. 3 Squadron personnel also participated in Operation Falconer, No. 75 Squadron's deployment to the Iraq War during 2003, conducting air interdiction operations and combat air patrols. The squadron currently forms part of the Air Combat Group's No. 81 Wing RAAF. In April 2016, No. 3 Squadron deployed to the Middle East during Operation Okra as part of the military intervention against ISIL, taking over from No. 77 Squadron.

On 8 December 2017, No. 3 Squadron ceased F/A-18 flight operations, followed by the disbandment of the squadron, under Wing Commander John Haly on 14 December 2017 and subsequent re-establishment of the squadron at Luke AFB in Arizona, under command of Wing Commander Darren Clare. All of its Hornets and most of its personnel were transferred to No. 77 Squadron. As of February 2018, No. 3 Squadron was equipped with two Lockheed Martin F-35 Lightning IIs and was scheduled to have ten of the type by the end of the year. It was planned to dispatch two of these F-35s to Australia in late 2018, the other eight remaining in the United States for training purposes.

== Aircraft operated ==
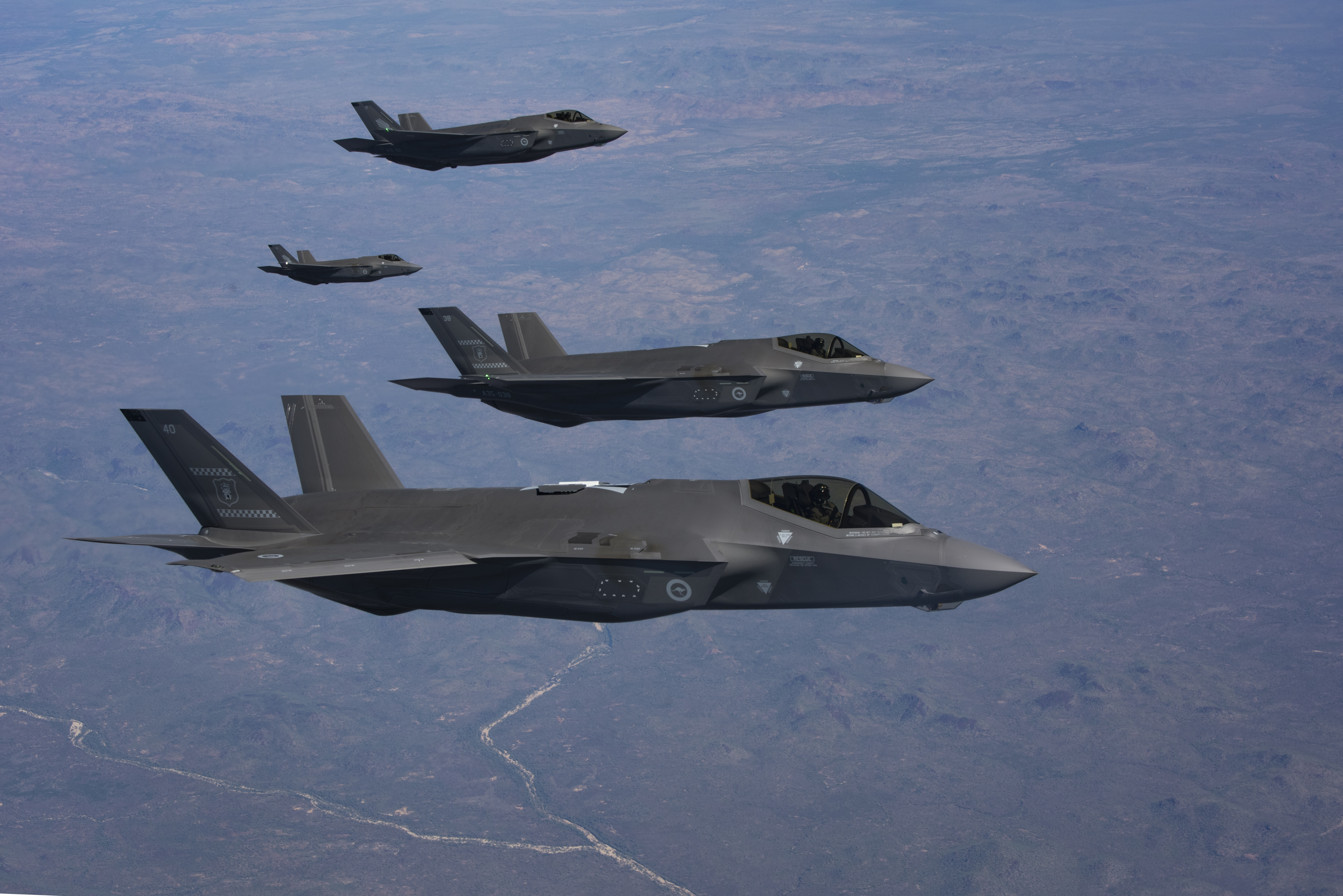
Two No. 3 Squadron F-35As (Far) & Two No. 77 Squadron F-35As (Close) in 2023

No. 3 Squadron has operated the following aircraft:

- Royal Aircraft Factory R.E.8 (1917–1918)
- Gloster Gauntlet, Gloster Gladiator, Westland Lysander (August 1940 – January 1941)
- Hawker Hurricane (January–May 1941)
- P-40 Tomahawk/Kittyhawk (May 1941 – November 1944)
- P-51D Mustang (November 1944 – July 1946)
- CAC Sabre (1956–1967)
- Mirage III (1967–1986)
- F/A-18 Hornet (August 1986 – December 2017)
- F-35A Lightning II (2018 – current)

== See also ==
- McDonnell Douglas F/A-18 Hornet in Australian service
