= Geelong Western Cemetery =

Cemetery in Victoria, Australia

- Interactive map of Geelong Western Cemetery

Details
- Established: 1855–1858
- Location: Herne Hill, Victoria
- Country: Australia
- Coordinates: 38°08′09″S 144°19′37″E
- No. of interments: >30,000
- Website: Official website
- Find a Grave: Geelong Western Cemetery

Geelong Western Cemetery is a cemetery located on Minerva Road, Herne Hill in the city of Geelong, Victoria in Australia.

The first burial taking place on 12 January 1858.

The cemetery was known under various names during its history; New Cemetery, New General Cemetery, Herne Hill Cemetery, Newtown Cemetery.

Its original layout was designed by Christopher Porter and its original plantings supplied by Baron von Mueller.

The cemetery has important historical associations with many Geelong families and tribal aboriginals of the district.

== Notable interments ==
- Willem Baa nip, also known as King Billy
- Brigadier Thomas Murdoch, Australian military engineer
- William Plain, Victorian MLA and Australian senator
- Sid Smith Sr., Australian rules footballer who played with Geelong in the VFL
- William Pritchard Weston, the third Premier of Tasmania

== War graves ==
The cemetery contains the war graves of 23 Commonwealth service personnel from World War I and World War II.
