= Willem Baa Nip =

Willem Baa Nip (c. 1836–1885) also known as King Billy, Wormebaneep, William Gore or Billy Wa-wha, was a member of the Wadawurrung (Wathaurung).

He was born in about 1836, on the banks of a lagoon believed to be located in central Geelong, near what is now Little Malop Street.

In 1861, the Duneed Aboriginal Land Reserve of one acre was set aside for Wadawurrung balug tribe on Ghazeepore Road just south of Andersons Creek, Mount Duneed.

Baa Nip would display his skills with traditional weapons at local parades and ask for money from the white-folk in return. On one occasion in 1883 when someone refused to give, Baa Nip exclaimed "Why do you not give, you should give me money, you live in my country."

Willem Baa Nip died on the 11 November 1885 of tuberculosis – 15 years after the last of his contemporaries Dan Dan Nook died of tuberculosis.

He was the last surviving member of the Wadawarrung to witness colonisation. His grave is in Geelong Western Cemetery.

A mural of Willem Baa Nip is featured in Dennys Place, Central Geelong.

A road constructed in 2015 in Armstrong Creek, Geelong was named Baanip Boulevard in recognition of him.
