= Sid Smith (footballer, born 1890) =

Australian rules footballer

Personal information
- Full name: Sidney Norman Smith
- Born: 25 October 1890; Geelong, Victoria
- Died: 26 February 1952 (aged 61); Geelong, Victoria
- Original team: Barwon Football Club

Playing career^{1}
Years	Club	Games (Goals)
1911	Geelong	5 (4)
- ^{1} Playing statistics correct to the end of 1911.

Sidney Norman Smith (25 October 1890 – 26 February 1952) was an Australian rules footballer who played with Geelong in the Victorian Football League (VFL).

== Family ==
The son of Frederick Smith (1860–1891), and Annie Elizabeth Smith (1863–1939), née Clarke, later Mrs. Archibald James Young, Sidney Norman Smith was born at Geelong on 25 October 1890.

He married Ivy Kathleen Keene (1892–1973) on 2 May 1918. Their son (also "Sid Smith") played for Geelong in 1952 and 1953.

== Football ==
Recruited from the Barwon Football Club in the local Geelong and District Football Association (GDFA), he played five senior VFL games for Geelong, in the first five rounds of the 1911 season, and then returned to play with the Barwon club.

== Death ==
He died in a private Geelong hospital on 26 February 1952, and was buried at the Geelong Western Public Cemetery.
