= 1st Pioneer Battalion (Australia) =

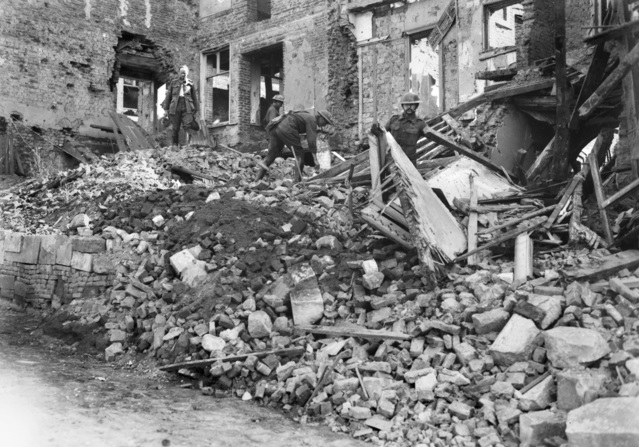
- Australian pioneers clearing mines in Peronne, September 1918
- Active: 1916–1919
- Country: Australia
- Branch: Australian Army
- Role: Pioneer
- Size: Battalion
- Part of: 1st Division
- Colours: Purple and white
- Engagements: First World War: Western Front

Insignia
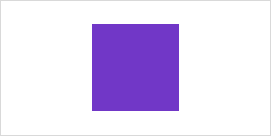
- Unit colour patch

The 1st Pioneer Battalion was an Australian infantry and light engineer unit raised for service during the First World War as part of the all volunteer Australian Imperial Force (AIF). Formed in Egypt in March 1916, the battalion subsequently served on the Western Front in France and Belgium, after being transferred to the European battlefields shortly after its establishment. Assigned to the 1st Division, the 1st Pioneer Battalion fought in most of the major battles that the AIF participated in between mid-1916 and the end of the war in November 1918. It was subsequently disbanded in early 1919.

== History ==
The 1st Pioneers were raised in Egypt, on 10 March 1916, from volunteers drawn from New South Wales who were subsequently assigned to the 1st Division. The battalion was formed in the aftermath of the failed Gallipoli campaign when the Australian Imperial Force (AIF) was expanded as part of plans to transfer it from the Middle East to Europe for service in the trenches along the Western Front. This expansion saw several new infantry divisions raised in Egypt and Australia, as well as specialist support units such as machine gun companies, engineer companies, artillery batteries and pioneer battalions. Trained as infantrymen, the pioneers were tasked with light combat engineer functions in the field, with a large number of personnel possessing trades from civilian life. The concept had existed within the British Indian Army before the war, but was adopted by the Australian Army in early 1916 to meet a need for troops with construction and engineering skills to assist with digging trenches, labouring, constructing strong points and undertaking battlefield clearance. At the same time, they could be pressed into the line to fight alongside regular infantry where required.

A total of five pioneer battalions were raised by the AIF during the war, with one being assigned to each of the five infantry divisions that the Australians deployed to the battlefield in France and Belgium. The battalion consisted of four companies, under a headquarters company. To identify the battalion's personnel, they were issued with a purple and white unit colour patch. The colours were in common with other Australian pioneer battalions, while the horizontal rectangle shape denoted that the unit was part of the 1st Division.

After a short period of training at Serapeum, in Egypt, in late March 1916 the 1st Pioneer Battalion embarked on a troopship from the port of Alexandria, bound for Marseille. After landing in France, they boarded a train and were subsequently transported to the Somme. From there, the 1st Pioneers moved to Armentieres where they established a camp, in an area which was dubbed a "nursery" sector by the Allies, where newly arrived units could gain their first experience of fighting on the Western Front. They subsequently entered the front line around Fleurbaix.

At Fleurbaix, the 1st Pioneers received new equipment and in late May were tasked with assisting the 2nd Australian Tunnelling Company in digging a mine towards German lines around the Cordonnerie Salient, where they were positioned opposite the 6th Bavarian Reserve Division. On the night of 30/31 May, the sector of the line the pioneers were digging under was subjected to a heavy artillery bombardment, followed by a trench raid. In the confusion that followed several of the battalion's personnel were killed or taken prisoner. One member of the battalion, Private William Cox, was subsequently nominated for a posthumous Victoria Cross for his actions during the raid, refusing to leave his pumping station despite the danger and despite already having been wounded. The award was later downgraded to a Mention in Despatches.

The battalion subsequently served on the Western Front until the end of the war in late 1918. After the battalion's introduction to trench warfare around Fleurbaix it was committed to the Battle of Pozieres in July 1916 where, under the command of Lieutenant Colonel Edmund Nicholson – an artillery officer who had served at Gallipoli – they laid the form-up trench for the attack, before being committed to the capture of the village itself. The battalion's losses in its first battle amounted to 180 killed or wounded. During the next two-and-a-half years, the battalion fought in most of the main battles that the Australians fought in along the Western Front. They took part in the Battle of Mouquet Farm later in 1916, and in early 1917, they were tasked with extending a light railway system towards Fremicourt as part of preparations for the Battle of Bullecourt. Later in the year, they took part in the Third Battle of Ypres, taking part in actions around the Menin Road, Polygon Wood, Broodseinde Ridge and Passchendaele. Later, around Ypres in October, the battalion worked to clear the Ypres–Zonnebeke road, which had virtually disappeared under a layer of thick mud and debris due to a prolonged artillery bombardment.

In early 1918, the Germans launched their Spring Offensive during which the 1st Pioneer Battalion, which had spent the winter around Messines, supported the 1st Division's operations around Hazebrouck in April, establishing the division's trench systems. From April 1918 until the end of the war, the battalion was commanded by Lieutenant Colonel Thomas Murdoch. After the defeat of the German offensive, a lull period followed during which the Allied armies sought to regain the initiative through a series of small scale actions dubbed peaceful penetrations, which were carried out throughout June and July 1918. During the Allied Hundred Days Offensive that was launched in August, which finally brought about an end to the war in late 1918, the pioneers took part in the Allied offensive around Amiens, supporting the capture of Lihons and then the exploitation beyond Proyart, losing around 80 casualties during the month. The following month they followed up the drive through the Somme until the 1st Division was withdrawn from the line in late September 1918. They remained out of the line until the armistice in November 1918 and did not see any further action. After the war, the battalion was disbanded in May 1919 as part of the demobilisation of the AIF and its personnel were repatriated back to Australia.

== Legacy ==
Within the AIF, according to historian William Westerman, the pioneer battalion concept was not "effectively employed by Australian commanders". In this regard, Westerman argues that the AIF pioneer battalions were rigidly utilized as either engineers or infantry, instead of "integrating those two functions". Additionally, while he argues that they were under utilised in their infantry roles, and that the amount of time that was spent training as infantry and the resources consumed was disproportionate for the amount of time they spent in the line undertaking infantry tasks. While some battalions, such as the 2nd Pioneers at Montrebrehain undertook successful infantry actions, units such the 1st and 4th Pioneers never saw action directly in their infantry role. Additionally, the units' separation from the field engineers resulted in "administrative, organisational and command and control problems" which even limited their utility as engineering formations.

After the war, the concept of pioneer battalions was discontinued in the Australian Army. In the immediate aftermath of the war, as plans were drawn up for the shape of the post conflict Army, a proposal was put forth to raise six pioneer battalions in the peacetime Army, but a combination of global disarmament and financial hardship resulted in this plan being scrapped. As a result, pioneer battalions disappeared from the Australian Army order of battalion until the Second World War, when four such battalions were raised as part of the Second Australian Imperial Force. According to Alexander Rodger, as a result of the decision not to re-raise pioneer battalions in the interwar years, no battle honours were subsequently awarded to the 1st Pioneer Battalion – or any other First World War pioneer battalion – as there was no equivalent unit to perpetuate the honours when they were promulgated by the Australian Army in 1927.
