= RAAF Washington Flying Unit =

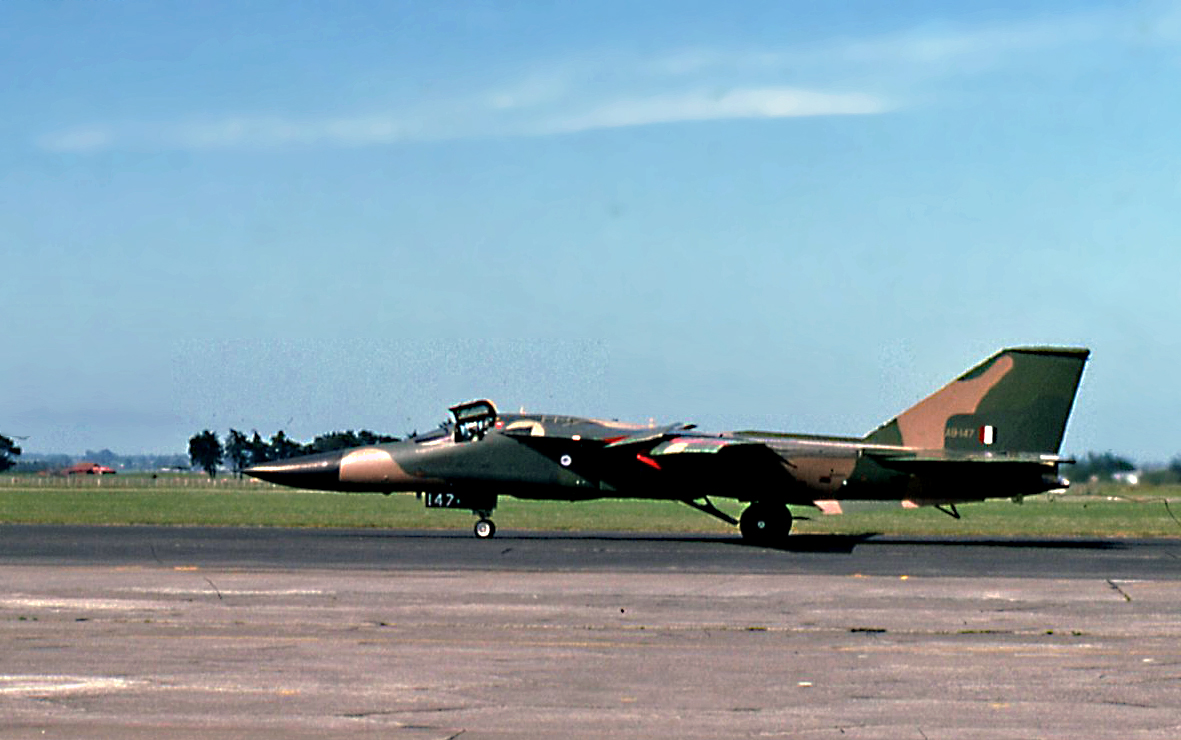
- A RAAF F-111 in 1975
- Active: 1973
- Country: Australia
- Branch: Royal Australian Air Force

Commanders
- Commander: John Newham

Aircraft flown
- Bomber: F-111C

The RAAF Washington Flying Unit was a temporary Royal Australian Air Force (RAAF) unit formed to ferry Australia's first twelve General Dynamics F-111C aircraft from the United States to Australia. It was formed in March 1973 and disbanded in July of that year after the ferry flights were completed.

== History ==
The RAAF Washington Flying Unit was formed at McClellan Air Force Base, California on 31 March 1973 under the command of Group Captain John Newham. The unit was tasked with ferrying the RAAF's first twelve (out of a total order of 24) F-111Cs to Australia. The unit comprised twelve F-111 crews, each consisting of a pilot and a navigator. Newham was also the commanding officer of No. 82 Wing, which was to operate the F-111Cs once they arrived in Australia.

Following their arrival in the United States, the Australian airmen were provided with training on the F-111 by General Dynamics. Once this was completed, they ferried F-111s from the company's facilities at Fort Worth to McClellan Air Force Base.

The first ferry flight of six F-111Cs departed McClellan Air Force Base in May 1973. The aircraft first flew to Hickam Air Force Base where they refueled. On 30 May they flew to Pago Pago International Airport. The next day they departed for RAAF Base Amberley, and arrived there on 1 June (Australian time). The remaining six F-111Cs began their ferry flight on 23 July, and used the same route as the first. Once this flight was completed and all twelve F-111Cs had arrived in Australia, the Washington Flying Unit was disbanded on 26 July 1973. The RAAF's other twelve F-111Cs were ferried to Australia in two flights later that year, which arrived at Amberley on 28 September and 4 December.

Despite the unit's name, the Washington Flying Unit was not the RAAF unit which was responsible for operating two Washington B.1 (B-29 Superfortress) heavy bombers in the early 1950s. These aircraft were operated by the RAAF's Aeronautical Research and Development Unit.
