= Tactical Transport Group RAAF =

Tactical Transport Group
- Active: 1988–1989
- Branch: Royal Australian Air Force

Tactical Transport Group was a Royal Australian Air Force (RAAF) group. It was established on 1 June 1988 as part of a broad-ranging reform of the RAAF's organisation.

The group commanded the RAAF units which were primarily responsible for providing tactical airlift for the Australian Army. These included No. 5 Squadron with Bell UH-1 Iroquois helicopters, No. 9 Squadron, which was equipped with Sikorsky S-70 Black Hawk helicopters, No. 12 Squadron with Boeing CH-47 Chinook helicopters, No. 35 Squadron which operated both Iroquois helicopters and de Havilland Canada DHC-4 Caribou fixed-wing aircraft and No. 38 Squadron which also operated Caribous.

At the time that Tactical Transport Group was formed the RAAF was in the process of preparing to transfer its helicopters to the Army. This change took place over 1989. No. 9 Squadron was disbanded on 14 February that year, with its helicopters and personnel becoming the 5th Aviation Regiment. No. 12 Squadron's Chinooks were withdrawn from service on 30 June and the squadron was disbanded on 25 August. On 5 December No. 35 Squadron transferred its Iroquois to the Army. No. 5 Squadron's Iroquois were also transferred to the Army during 1989, and the unit was absorbed into the Australian Defence Force Helicopter School on 9 December.

The Tactical Transport Group was disbanded in February 1991. The two squadrons equipped with Caribous became part of the Air Lift Group.
