= Chief of Air Force (Australia) =

Head of the Royal Australian Air Force

- Incumbent; Stephen Chappell since 3 July 2024
- Royal Australian Air Force
- Style: Air Marshal
- Abbreviation: CAF
- Member of: Australian Defence Force
- Reports to: Chief of the Defence Force
- Term length: Four years; (renewable)
- Formation: October 1922
- First holder: Richard Williams
- Deputy: Deputy Chief of Air Force

The chief of Air Force (CAF) is the most senior appointment in the Royal Australian Air Force (RAAF), responsible to the chief of the Defence Force (CDF) and the secretary of Defence. The rank associated with the position is air marshal (three-star). The role encompasses "the delivery of aerospace capability, enhancing the Air Force's reputation and positioning the Air Force for the future". It does not include direction of air operations, which is the purview of the Air Commander Australia, a two-star position responsible directly to CDF in such circumstances but nominally reporting to CAF.

Between 1922 and 1997, the Air Force's senior officer was known as chief of the air staff (CAS), a role akin to a chairman of the board. The Australian Air Board was collectively responsible for directing the RAAF, rather than the CAS personally. Wing Commander (later Air Marshal Sir) Richard Williams, often referred to as the "Father of the RAAF", was the first and longest-serving chief of the air staff. In 1976 the Air Board was dissolved and CAS was invested with the individual responsibility for commanding the RAAF. The position of CAS became known as chief of Air Force in 1997.

The chief of Air Force may be selected from any of the RAAF's air vice-marshal appointments, although the Air Commander or deputy chief of Air Force are the most frequent appointees. While every chief to date has been a pilot, since the mid-1970s there has been no legal restriction on appointees from other disciplines. The CAF is appointed by the Prime Minister and is usually a fixed-term tenure, after which the member normally retires, unless offered the more senior role of CDF. Four heads of the RAAF have gone on to attain the position of CDF or equivalent.

== History ==
=== 1922–38: Williams and Goble ===
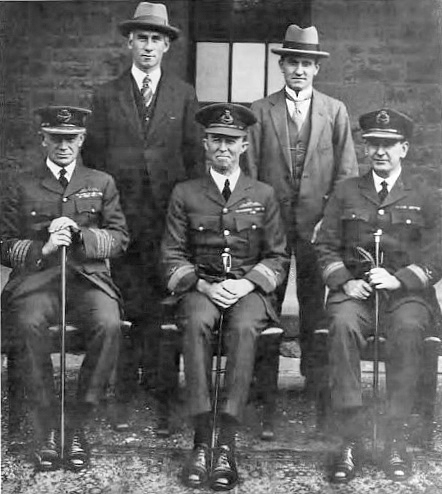
The inaugural Air Board, including Group Captain Stanley Goble (front row, left) and Air Commodore Richard Williams (front row, centre)

The position now known as Chief of Air Force had its beginnings in the years immediately following World War I. A permanent Air Board was instituted on 9 November 1920 to oversee the day-to-day running of a proposed Australian Air Force, which would succeed the extant Australian Air Corps that had itself succeeded the wartime Australian Flying Corps. On 31 March 1921, the Australian Air Force came into being, the "Royal" prefix being added five months later.

Wing Commander (later Air Marshal Sir) Richard Williams served as the first Chief of the Air Staff, commencing in 1922. The senior member of the Air Board, from April 1921 until October 1922 Williams was known as First Air Member, the fledgling Air Force initially not being deemed suitable for a Chief of Staff appointment equivalent to the Army and Navy.

Wing Commander (later Air Vice Marshal) Stanley Goble took over as CAS from Williams in December 1922, and over the next 17 years the two World War I veterans alternated in the position, an arrangement that "almost inevitably fostered an unproductive rivalry" according to RAAF historian Dr Alan Stephens. The Chief of the Air Staff position was intended to be "first among equals' on the Air Board, with decisions arrived at collectively and members able to submit dissenting reports to the Minister for Air if they wished, but Williams dominated the Board in the 1920s and 30s to such an extent that in 1939 Goble complained that his colleague appeared to consider the Air Force his personal command.

Cumulatively Williams served longer as CAS than any other officer, over 13 years, and is accorded much of the credit for maintaining the RAAF's position as an independent service in the face of attempts to turn it into a branch of either the Army or Navy. For this achievement, as much as for his involvement in its establishment, he is, in Stephens' words, "properly regarded as the 'father' of the Air Force".

=== 1939–45: Crisis in command ===
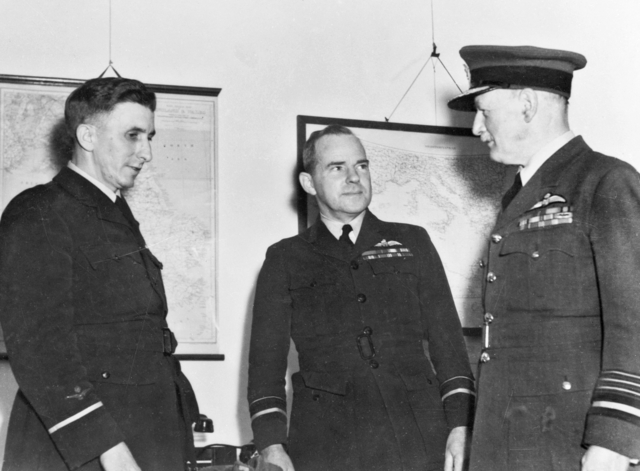
Recently appointed CAS Air Vice Marshal George Jones (left) with Air Vice Marshal William Bostock (centre) and outgoing CAS Air Chief Marshal Sir Charles Burnett in 1942

The Williams-Goble duopoly ended in 1940. Williams was dismissed from his post in 1939 following publication of the Ellington Report, which criticised the level of air safety observed by the RAAF. Goble took over with the prospect of finally emerging from Williams' shadow but was concerned by, among other things, the emphasis he was required to place on the Empire Air Training Scheme (EATS), which promised to provide manpower for the air war in Europe at the expense of local defence. Goble refused to continue in the post and offered his resignation.

The Air Force expected Williams to be reappointed in Goble's place, but the United Australia Party government under Robert Menzies determined that a British officer should lead the RAAF rather than Williams or any emerging Australian senior officer. Following the temporary appointment of Air Commodore William Anderson (like Williams, a veteran of the Australian Flying Corps), the RAF's Air Chief Marshal Sir Charles Burnett became CAS in February 1940. Burnett proved to be a controversial figure with his record being described as "uninspiring and undistinguished" by his detractors, and as "formidable" by his supporters. During his time as CAS Burnett's prime focus was EATS but he also founded the Women's Auxiliary Australian Air Force (WAAAF) and RAAF health services, the latter having previously been provided by the Army.

The next CAS was a major surprise to the service and to the appointee himself. George Jones was only a substantive wing commander and acting air commodore when he succeeded to the role in 1942, leapfrogging several more senior officers including the Deputy Chief of the Air Staff, Air Vice Marshal William Bostock, a highly regarded commander who was expecting to take the position. Bostock was soon made head of RAAF Command, in charge of Australian air operations in the Pacific, while Jones' role was primarily administrative, to "raise, train and maintain" the service. Though Jones as CAS was nominally in charge of the RAAF, his new rank of Air Vice Marshal was the same as Bostock's and the command structure was not clear cut.

The situation led to a "disastrous" conflict at the top of the service, going far beyond the rivalry of Williams and Goble. Bostock was able to circumvent directives from Jones and the Air Board by appealing directly to Lieutenant General George Kenney, USAAF, Douglas MacArthur's chief of Pacific air operations. Jones in turn could curtail Bostock's supplies of manpower and equipment, as he did during the invasion of Tarakan in 1945 when he unilaterally grounded Australian bomber squadrons scheduled to take part in the attack. The Curtin Labor government did not act decisively to end the rift, its reaction being to again look to Britain for a suitable RAF officer senior to both men, though in the end nothing came of this. Kenney wrote that Jones and Bostock "fight each other harder than the Japs", but that he preferred their feuding to having a British officer in charge of the RAAF.

=== 1946–75: Consolidation ===
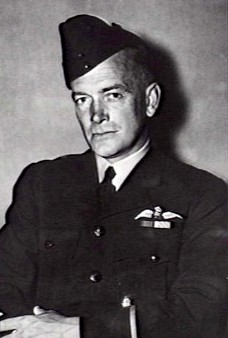
Air Marshal (later Air Chief Marshal) Sir Frederick Scherger

Williams, Goble and Bostock were summarily retired in 1946. Jones, belatedly promoted to air marshal in 1948, oversaw the demobilisation of thousands of RAAF personnel and the creation of a peacetime service. The RAAF committed aircraft to the Malayan Emergency, on Jones' condition that the Air Officer Commanding all Commonwealth air force units would be from the RAAF. The British Air Ministry agreed and Air Vice Marshal Frederick Scherger took the post, regarded as a key stepping stone to his own eventual appointment as CAS. Jones also allocated No. 77 Squadron to Allied forces when the Korean War broke out in 1950.

Jones' ten years as CAS was the longest continuous term of any RAAF chief. When he was retired in 1952, the Menzies Liberal government again chose an RAF officer for the role, this time Air Marshal (later Air Chief Marshal) Sir James (Donald) Hardman. While the choice of a British officer caused resentment in the Air Force, Hardman was described by The Age newspaper as a "brilliant organiser", and changed the RAAF's structure from one based on geographical area to one based on function, leading to the creation of Home (operational), Maintenance (support), and Training Commands.

Hardman was succeeded in 1954 by Air Marshal Sir John McCauley, who expanded RAAF Darwin as Australia's major frontline base. The concept of shifting the Air Force's "centre of gravity" northwards was taken a step further by the next CAS, Air Marshal Sir Frederick Scherger, who proposed a series of "bare bases" across the north-west of Australia, beginning with the development of RAAF Tindal, south of Darwin (later to become a permanent base). Following his service as CAS, Scherger was appointed Chairman of the Chiefs of Staff Committee from 1961 to 1966, during which time he was promoted to Air Chief Marshal. He was the first RAAF officer to serve as Chairman of COSC, the Australian defence forces' senior position at the time, after an Army member and a Navy member. Air Marshal Sir Valston Hancock continued the policy of developing bare bases in Northern Australia, concentrating on RAAF Learmonth in Western Australia. He also recommended the General Dynamics F-111 as the aircraft best suited to replace the Canberra jet bomber as Australia's prime aerial strike platform.

The next CAS, Air Marshal Sir Alister Murdoch, began his term in 1966 and led the RAAF through the middle period of Australia's involvement in the Vietnam War. His initial refusal to commit newly purchased UH-1 Iroquois helicopters to the conflict for support of land forces has been blamed for fostering long-running enmity between the Air Force and the Army. Air Marshal Sir Colin Hannah commenced what was expected to be a three-year term as CAS in January 1970, but resigned early to become Governor of Queensland in March 1972, the first time an RAAF officer was appointed to a vice regal position. He was succeeded by his Deputy CAS, Air Marshal Sir Charles Read, whose tenure coincided with the long-delayed entry into service of the F-111C supersonic swing-wing bomber.

=== 1976–present: A new role ===
Air Marshal Sir James Rowland was the first CAS to personally command the RAAF in a legal sense, following dissolution of the Air Board in 1976, a consequence of defence reorganisation in the wake of the 'Tange report' in 1973. A new Chief of the Air Staff Advisory Committee (CASAC) was set up, but there was no requirement for the CAS to accept its advice. At the same time, the stipulation for the appointee to be a member of the RAAF's General Duties (aircrew) Branch was removed. Rowland served from 1975 to 1979, going on to become Governor of New South Wales. His successor, Air Marshal (later Air Chief Marshal) Sir Neville McNamara would, from 1982 to 1984, be the first Air Force member to command all three services as Chief of the Defence Force Staff (CDFS), which had replaced the position of Chairman of COSC in 1976. Shortly after McNamara retired, CDFS was renamed Chief of the Defence Force (CDF).

Air Marshal David Evans played a major part in developing the RAAF's plans for the defence of Australia in the mid-1980s and beyond. The Air Force's role in shaping an overall strategy that exploited the "air-sea gap" was later acknowledged in the Federal Government paper "The Defence of Australia 1987". CAS from 1987 to 1992, Air Marshal Ray Funnell focused on turning the RAAF into the "air power element of a cohesive, integrated defence force". His service also saw the publication of The Air Power Manual, the RAAF's first self-produced treatise on aerial war fighting.

During the 1980s and 90s, conduct of air operations became the responsibility of the Air Commander Australia, a two-star rank, answerable direct to CDF in these circumstances but subordinate administratively to CAS. The operational authority of CAS thus decreased, its role once more becoming primarily to "raise, train and maintain" the Air Force. The relationship between the positions of CAS and Air Commander now resembled that between CAS and AOC RAAF Command during World War II, but the risk of another demarcation dispute such as arose between Jones and Bostock was mitigated by the overarching CDF role, which had not existed during the earlier conflict.

Air Marshal Les Fisher, who headed the RAAF from 1994 to 1998, served as the last CAS and the first Chief of Air Force (CAF), the change of name occurring in 1997. Fisher instituted a policy requiring staff to meet minimum physical fitness standards to remain in the service, for the first time in Air Force history. Air Marshal Errol McCormack commanded the RAAF as it moved into the 21st century, addressing fundamental cultural questions such as the balance of change and tradition, and whether defence should be run like a business. Beginning in 2000, he reintroduced the distinctive dark blue uniform that had been chosen by Richard Williams in the 1920s but discarded in 1972 by then-CAS, Air Marshal Hannah, in favour of a more neutral blue suit. McCormack's successor, Air Marshal Angus Houston, became well known to the public for contradicting the Federal Government's version of events in relation to the Children Overboard Affair. In 2005, Houston was promoted to Chief of the Defence Force, the third Air Force member out of 18 Chiefs of the Defence Force or equivalent, and the third to achieve the rank of air chief marshal.

== Appointees ==
The following lists all chiefs of the RAAF, ranks and honours as at completion of their tours.

Chief of the Air Staff
Rank	Name	Post- Nominals	Service	Term began	Term ended	Time in appointment
Wing Commander	Richard Williams	DSO, OBE	RAAF	October 1922	December 1922	61 days
Wing Commander	Stanley Goble	CBE, DSO, DSC	RAAF	December 1922	February 1925	2 years, 62 days
Air Commodore	Richard Williams	CBE, DSO	RAAF	February 1925	December 1932	7 years, 304 days
Air Commodore	Stanley Goble	CBE, DSO, DSC	RAAF	December 1932	June 1934	1 year, 182 days
Air Vice Marshal	Richard Williams	CB, CBE, DSO	RAAF	June 1934	February 1939	5 years, 0 days
Air Vice Marshal	Stanley Goble	CBE, DSO, DSC	RAAF	February 1939	January 1940	334 days
Air Commodore	William Anderson	CBE, DFC	RAAF	January 1940	February 1940	31 days
Air Chief Marshal	Sir Charles Burnett	KCB, CBE, DSO	RAF	February 1940	May 1942	2 years, 89 days
Air Marshal	George Jones	CB, CBE, DFC	RAAF	May 1942	January 1952	9 years, 245 days
Air Marshal	Sir Donald Hardman	KCB, OBE, DFC	RAF	January 1952	January 1954	2 years, 0 days
Air Marshal	Sir John McCauley	KBE, CB	RAAF	January 1954	March 1957	3 years, 59 days
Air Marshal	Sir Frederick Scherger	KBE, CB, DSO, AFC	RAAF	March 1957	May 1961	4 years, 61 days
Air Marshal	Sir Valston Hancock	KBE, CB, DFC	RAAF	May 1961	May 1965	4 years, 0 days
Air Marshal	Sir Alister Murdoch	KBE, CB	RAAF	June 1965	December 1969	4 years, 183 days
Air Marshal	Sir Colin Hannah	KBE, CB	RAAF	January 1970	March 1972	2 years, 60 days
Air Marshal	Charles Read	CB, DFC, AFC	RAAF	March 1972	March 1975	3 years, 0 days
Air Marshal	Sir James Rowland	KBE, DFC, AFC	RAAF	March 1975	March 1979	4 years, 0 days
Air Marshal	Sir Neville McNamara	KBE, AO, AFC, AE	RAAF	March 1979	April 1982	3 years, 31 days
Air Marshal	David Evans	AC, DSO, AFC	RAAF	April 1982	May 1985	3 years, 30 days
Air Marshal	John Newham	AC	RAAF	May 1985	July 1987	2 years, 61 days
Air Marshal	Ray Funnell	AC	RAAF	July 1987	October 1992	5 years, 92 days
Air Marshal	Barry Gration	AO, AFC	RAAF	October 1992	November 1994	2 years, 31 days
Air Marshal	Les Fisher	AO	RAAF	November 1994	February 1997	2 years, 92 days
Chief of Air Force
Air Marshal	Les Fisher	AO	RAAF	February 1997	May 1998	1 year, 89 days
Air Marshal	Errol McCormack	AO	RAAF	May 1998	June 2001	3 years, 31 days
Air Marshal	Angus Houston	AO, AFC	RAAF	June 2001	July 2005	4 years, 14 days
Air Marshal	Geoff Shepherd	AO	RAAF	July 2005	July 2008	3 years, 0 days
Air Marshal	Mark Binskin	AO	RAAF	July 2008	July 2011	3 years, 0 days
Air Marshal	Geoff Brown	AO	RAAF	July 2011	July 2015	4 years, 0 days
Air Marshal	Leo Davies	AO, CSC	RAAF	July 2015	July 2019	3 years, 364 days
Air Marshal	Mel Hupfeld	AO, DSC	RAAF	July 2019	July 2022	2 years, 363 days
Air Marshal	Robert Chipman	AO, CSC	RAAF	July 2022	July 2024	2 years, 2 days
Air Marshal	Stephen Chappell	DSC, CSC, OAM	RAAF	July 2024	Incumbent	2 years, 104 days

== See also ==
- Chief of the Air Staff (disambiguation)
- Structure of the RAAF
