= RAAF Squadron Berlin Air Lift =

Royal Australian Air Force squadron

Berlin Airlift Squadron RAAF
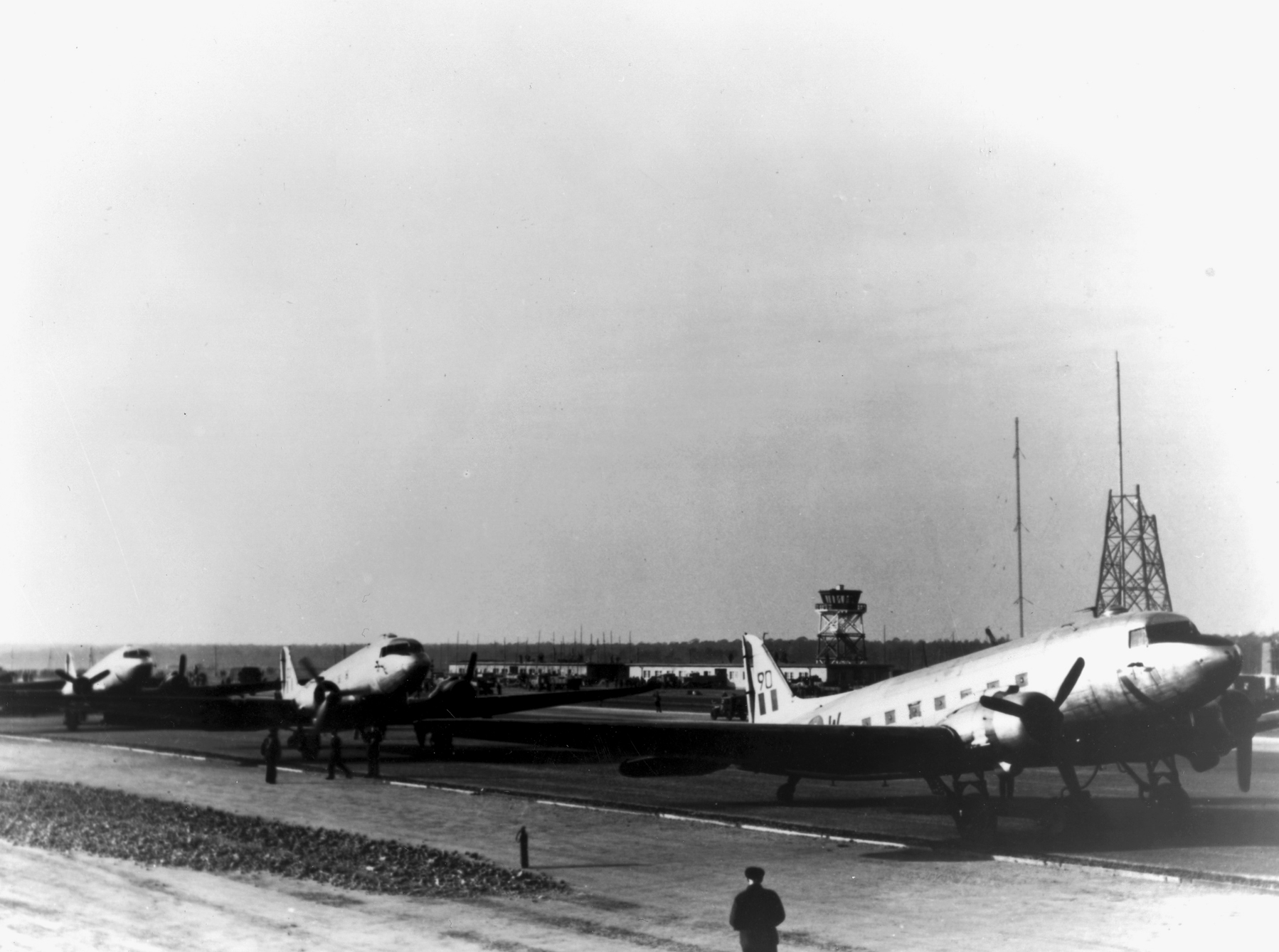
- RAF Dakotas during the airlift, similar to those operated by the RAAF
- Active: 1948–1949
- Country: Australia
- Branch: Royal Australian Air Force
- Garrison/HQ: Lübeck, West Germany

Commanders
- Notable commanders: Cyril Greenwood

Aircraft flown
- Transport: Douglas Dakota

The Berlin Airlift Squadron was a Royal Australian Air Force (RAAF) transport squadron formed to participate in the Berlin Airlift. The unit operated for one year, between August 1948 and August 1949, and was raised specifically for the operation, drawing crews from two existing RAAF transport squadrons. It flew more than 2,000 sorties during the airlift, without loss.

== History ==
In mid-1948, the Soviet Union placed the French-, British- and American sectors of the occupied city of Berlin under blockade following a dispute with the western powers, cutting off the city's land supply routes. As a humanitarian disaster loomed, a large-scale airlift was planned by the western powers to fly in aid to the city's population. To support the effort, the Australian Government offered aircraft and aircrews to bolster the contribution of the United Kingdom's Royal Air Force (RAF). Due to the inability of the RAF to fully crew its own Dakotas, the decision was made for the Australian contribution to be limited to aircrew who would utilise British aircraft. The Berlin Airlift Squadron was formed at RAAF Richmond in August 1948 from ten Douglas Dakota crews drawn from No. 36 and No. 38 Squadrons. In late August, the crews travelled to the United Kingdom as passengers in Qantas flying boats. The Australian contribution to the airlift, from September 1948, was designated Operation Pelican.

After receiving training at RAF Bassingbourn in the UK, the aircrew moved to Lübeck in the British Zone of Allied-occupied Germany on 14 and 15 September. The first Australian flight into Berlin was on 15 September 1948, by the unit's commanding officer, Squadron Leader Cyril Greenwood. The squadron conducted 2,062 flights in all over the course of the next 11 months, with the last completed on 26 August 1949. To increase the payloads of each sortie, co-pilots were removed from the crews and were eventually sent back to the United Kingdom, to ferry several Bristol Freighter aircraft, which had been recently purchased by the RAAF, to Australia.

Flying via the 32-kilometre (20 mi) wide northern corridor to RAF Gatow, and then later to the partially completed Tegel airport in November and December 1948, a total of 6,041 flight hours were tallied, with the squadron carrying 6,964 passengers and delivering 8,000 tonnes (7,900 long tons; 8,800 short tons) of supplies. On arrival in Berlin, the aircraft were unloaded by German workers. On return, the aircraft were sometimes diverted to Schleswig and Hamburg when Lübeck was closed. Flights were undertaken in all weather, at all hours.

In addition to the Berlin Airlift Squadron, the RAAF also contributed crews on rotation to the Avro York-equipped No. 24 (Commonwealth) Squadron RAF. The Berlin Airlift Squadron returned to Australia via the United Kingdom, where its personnel were accommodated at RAF Manston, before returning to Australia aboard an RAF York, on 24 October 1949.

Weather and interference from Soviet aircraft posed threats to the Berlin Airlift. No fatalities or losses were suffered by the squadron, although one Australian was killed during the airlift while serving on exchange with No. 27 Squadron RAF. A total of 41 personnel were contributed initially, of which 16 were rotated home part way through the deployment, with six personnel being sent as replacements; two members were decorated with the Air Force Cross for their role in the airlift.

== Commanding officer ==
- Squadron Leader Cyril Greenwood
