= Thomas Murdoch (engineer) =

Australian military engineer

- Born: 16 April 1876; Milawa, Victoria
- Died: 13 July 1961 (aged 85); Geelong, Victoria
- Relatives: Major General Ian Murdoch (son); Air Marshal Sir Alister Murdoch (son)
- Military career
- Allegiance: Australia
- Branch: Australian Army
- Service years: 1901–1930; 1939–1941
- Rank: Brigadier
- Commands: Director General of Engineer Services (1940–41); 1st Pioneer Battalion (1918)
- Conflicts: First World War; Western Front; Second World War
- Awards: Distinguished Service Order; Mentioned in Despatches

Brigadier Thomas Murdoch, DSO (16 April 1876 – 13 July 1961) was an Australian military engineer who served in both the First and Second World Wars. Having retired from the military in 1937, he was recalled and served as Director General of engineer services during the Second World War.

Murdoch served in the 1st Pioneer Battalion, Australian Imperial Force in France and Flanders, and was awarded the Distinguished Service Order (DSO).

On 25 April 1905 in Elsternwick, Melbourne, he married Kathleen Tiernan; they had two daughters and three sons, who included Major General Ian Murdoch and Air Marshal Sir Alister Murdoch. Predeceased by his wife and a daughter, Murdoch died at Geelong on 13 July 1961 and was buried in Geelong Western Cemetery with Presbyterian forms.
