= RAAF College =

Royal Australian Air Force College
- Type: Military academy, air force
- Established: 1 August 1947 at Point Cook
- Students: Royal Australian Air Force and other Australian Defence Force personnel
- Location: RAAF Base Wagga, New South Wales, Australia

The Royal Australian Air Force College (commonly known as the RAAF College and abbreviated as RAAFCOL) is the Royal Australian Air Force training and education academy which is responsible for all the Air Force's initial, career development, promotion and leadership training. The RAAF College is headquartered at RAAF Base Wagga, 10 km (6 mi) east of the city of Wagga Wagga, New South Wales.

== History ==
The RAAF College was founded after World War II on 1 August 1947 when it was established at Point Cook as an academy training elite aircrew (and some engineering) officer cadets; the majority of the RAAF's most senior commanders received their initial training there. It was renamed as the RAAF Academy in 1961. Its role changed substantially in 2008 when the unit re-formed at RAAF Base Wagga (Note: 35°08′56″S 147°28′04″E) to become a centre for training mainly airmen and airwomen (Note: Those in ranks below those of commissioned officers.) at entry and specialist levels, with of a number of schools elsewhere that have similar roles.

== Functions and organization ==
RAAF College also provides entry level and specialist training across a broad range of ground-based musterings[note 3] and specialisations including security, fire and ground defence, administration and logistics, technical trades, and explosive ordnance. RAAF College manages the following schools and units in Australia: No. 1 Recruit Training Unit (Wagga); Officer Training School (East Sale); School of Postgraduate Studies (Wagga), with Corporal promotion centres at Richmond and Amberley; Air Force Band (Williams); Defence International Training Centre (Williams); RAAF School of Administration and Logistics Training (Wagga); Defence Explosive Ordnance Training School (Orchard Hills); RAAF School of Technical Training (Wagga); and the RAAF Security and Fire School (Amberley).[2]
