= List of British Commonwealth Air Training Plan facilities in Australia =

Empire Air Training Scheme
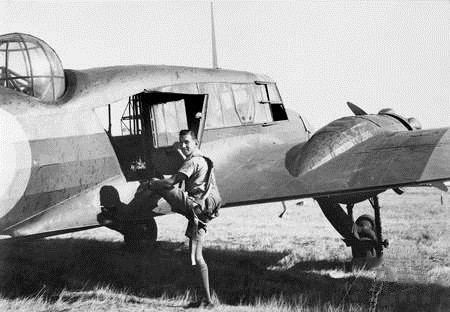
- Student pilot of No. 4 Service Flying Training School boarding his Avro Anson, March 1942
- Active: 1939–1945
- Country: Australia
- Branch: Royal Australian Air Force
- Role: Aircrew training
- Part of: British Commonwealth Air Training Plan
- Aircraft: Airspeed Oxford; Avro Anson; Avro Cadet; CAC Wirraway; De Havilland Dragon Rapide; De Havilland Gypsy Moth; De Havilland Tiger Moth; Douglas C-47 Dakota; Hawker Demon; Westland Wapiti
- Engagements: World War II

This is a List of facilities of the British Commonwealth Air Training Plan in Australia (BCATP), a major program for training Royal Australian Air Force (RAAF) air crews during World War II for service with the Royal Air Force. Agreed in December 1939, the program was known in Australia as the Empire Air Training Scheme (EATS). The first Australian training schools were established the following year. Course duration and content evolved over time but the basic structure of the scheme remained the same for the duration of the war. Over 52,000 personnel enlisted in the RAAF as aircrew and some 37,000 graduated from EATS schools.

== Facilities ==
=== Central Flying School ===
Formed in 1940, Central Flying School was responsible for training flying instructors and was located initially at Point Cook, Victoria. It soon relocated to Camden, New South Wales, then to Tamworth, New South Wales, in 1942 and Parkes, New South Wales, in 1944.

=== Initial Training Schools ===
Recruits started their training at an Initial Training School (ITS) to learn the basics of Air Force life. The course ran 14 weeks for prospective pilots, 12 weeks for air observers, and 8 weeks for air gunners.

- No. 1 Initial Training School, Somers, Victoria
- No. 2 Initial Training School, Bradfield Park, New South Wales
- No. 3 Initial Training School, Sandgate, Queensland.
- No. 4 Initial Training School, Victor Harbor, South Australia.
- No. 5 Initial Training School, Pearce, Western Australia
- No. 6 Initial Training School, Bradfield Park, New South Wales

=== Elementary Flying Training Schools ===
The Elementary Flying Training School (EFTS) course lasted 12 weeks and gave recruits up to 75 hours of basic aviation instruction on a simple trainer like the Tiger Moth. Pilots who showed promise went on to advanced training at a Service Flying Training School. Others went on to different specialty schools, such as Wireless Schools, Air Observer Schools or Bombing and Gunnery Schools.

- No. 1 Elementary Flying Training School, initially No. 2 Flying Training School, Parafield, South Australia, renamed No. 1 EFTS, relocated to Tamworth, New South Wales
- No. 2 Elementary Flying Training School, initially No. 3 Flying Training School, Archerfield, Queensland, renamed No. 2 EFTS
- No. 3 Elementary Flying Training School, Essendon, Victoria
- No. 4 Elementary Flying Training School, Mascot, New South Wales
- No. 5 Elementary Flying Training School, Narromine, New South Wales
- No. 6 Elementary Flying Training School, Tamworth, New South Wales.
- No. 7 Elementary Flying Training School, Western Junction, Tasmania
- No. 8 Elementary Flying Training School, Narrandera, New South Wales
- No. 9 Elementary Flying Training School, Cunderdin, Western Australia
- No. 10 Elementary Flying Training School, Temora, New South Wales
- No. 11 Elementary Flying Training School, Benalla, Victoria
- No. 12 Elementary Flying Training School, Bundaberg, Queensland, relocated to Lowood, Queensland

=== Service Flying Training Schools ===
The Service Flying Training School (SFTS) course ran for 24 weeks and provided advanced training for pilots on single- and multi-engined aircraft, closer in performance to the types they would eventually fly as operational or "service" pilots. Prospective fighter pilots underwent air gunnery instruction at the SFTS, while bomber pilots undertook two weeks instruction at a Bombing and Gunnery School.

- No. 1 Service Flying Training School, formed from No. 1 Flying Training School, Point Cook, Victoria
- No. 2 Service Flying Training School, Forest Hill, New South Wales
- No. 3 Service Flying Training School, Amberley, Queensland
- No. 4 Service Flying Training School, Geraldton, Western Australia
- No. 5 Service Flying Training School, Uranquinty, New South Wales
- No. 6 Service Flying Training School, Mallala, South Australia
- No. 7 Service Flying Training School, Deniliquin, New South Wales
- No. 8 Service Flying Training School, Bundaberg, Queensland

=== Air Observer Schools ===
- No. 1 Air Observers School, Cootamundra, New South Wales, relocated to Evans Head, New South Wales
- No. 2 Air Observers School, Mount Gambier, South Australia
- No. 3 Air Observers School, Port Pirie, South Australia

=== Bombing and Gunnery Schools ===
- No. 1 Bombing and Gunnery School, Evans Head, New South Wales
- No. 2 Bombing and Gunnery School, Port Pirie, South Australia
- No. 3 Bombing and Gunnery School, West Sale, renamed Air Gunnery School
- Central Gunnery School, Sale, Victoria, relocated to Mildura, Victoria and later Cressy, Victoria.

=== Air Navigation Schools ===
- No. 1 Air Navigation School, Parkes, New South Wales
- No. 2 Air Navigation School, Mount Gambier, South Australia, relocated to Nhill, Victoria.

=== Wireless Air Gunners Schools ===
- No. 1 Wireless Air Gunners School, Ballarat, Victoria
- No. 2 Wireless Air Gunners School, Parkes, New South Wales
- No. 3 Wireless Air Gunners School, Maryborough, Queensland

=== General Reconnaissance School ===
The General Reconnaissance School was formed at Point Cook, Victoria, in 1940 It subsequently relocated to Laverton, Victoria, then Cressy, Victoria, and finally Bairnsdale, Victoria

== See also ==
- List of British Commonwealth Air Training Plan facilities in Canada
- List of British Commonwealth Air Training Plan facilities in South Africa
