= No. 1 Elementary Flying Training School RAAF =

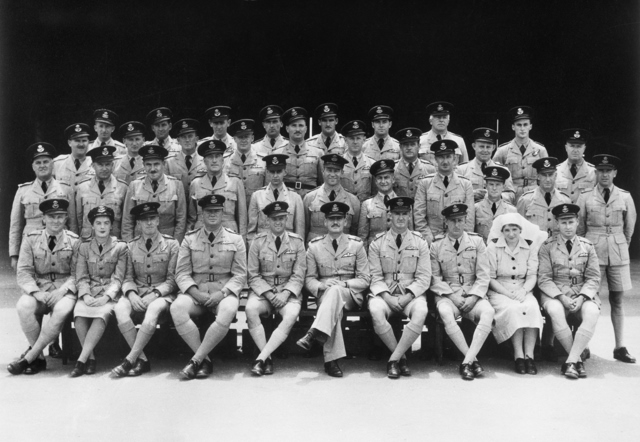
- Staff of No. 1 Elementary Flying Training School, December 1942
- Active: 1939–44
- Country: Australia
- Branch: Royal Australian Air Force
- Role: Introductory flying training
- Part of: Southern Area Command (1940–41); No. 1 (Training) Group (1941–44); No. 2 (Training) Group (1944)
- Garrison/HQ: Parafield, South Australia
- Service: World War II

Aircraft flown
- Trainer: Tiger Moth; Gipsy Moth; Wackett Trainer

No. 1 Elementary Flying Training School (No. 1 EFTS) was a Royal Australian Air Force (RAAF) pilot training unit that operated during World War II. It was one of twelve elementary flying training schools employed by the RAAF to provide introductory flight instruction to new pilots as part of Australia's contribution to the Empire Air Training Scheme. The unit was established in November 1939 as No. 2 Flying Training School at Melbourne, Victoria. It was relocated to Parafield, South Australia, in December 1939 and renamed No. 1 EFTS the following month. Training activities relocated to Tamworth, New South Wales, in May 1944; the school was disbanded in December that year.

== History ==
Flying instruction in the Royal Australian Air Force (RAAF) underwent major changes following the outbreak of World War II, in response to a vast increase in the number of aircrew volunteers and the commencement of Australia's participation in the Empire Air Training Scheme (EATS). The Air Force's pre-war pilot training facility, No. 1 Flying Training School at RAAF Station Point Cook, Victoria, was supplanted in 1940–41 by twelve elementary flying training schools (EFTS) and eight service flying training schools (SFTS). The EFTS provided a twelve-week introductory flying course to personnel who had graduated from one of the RAAF's initial training schools. Flying training was undertaken in two stages: the first involved four weeks of instruction (including ten hours of flying) to determine trainees' suitability to become pilots. Those that passed this grading process then received a further eight weeks of training (including sixty-five hours of flying) at the EFTS. Pilots who successfully completed this course were posted to an SFTS in either Australia or Canada for the next stage of their instruction as military aviators.

No. 1 Elementary Flying Training School was formed as No. 2 Flying Training School in Melbourne on 6 November 1939. Its inaugural commanding officer was Squadron Leader F.J.B. Wight. On 13 December, the school moved to Parafield, South Australia, after building work was completed there. Parafield was home to the South Australian Aero Club, and it was the airfield's position as the hub of civilian flight instruction in the state that led to it becoming the base for the first flying school the RAAF raised during World War II. The same principle was followed in establishing No. 3 Flying Training School (later renamed No. 2 Elementary Flying Training School) at Archerfield, Queensland, No. 3 Elementary Flying Training School at Essendon, Victoria, and No. 4 Elementary Flying Training School at Mascot, New South Wales.

No. 2 Flying Training School's first thirteen de Havilland Gipsy Moth training aircraft were delivered to Parafield on 16–17 December 1939. The unit was renamed No. 1 Elementary Flying Training School (No. 1 EFTS) on 2 January 1940. The first eight-week flying training course began on 8 January with twenty-three students; another joined a week later. According to the unit operations book, limited flying was possible owing to the number of available parachutes but, on 19 January, "permission was granted to continue training without them until supplies were forthcoming". The second flying course began on 5 February. An instructor and his cadet were killed in a crash on 19 March. No. 1 EFTS's complement of aircraft was augmented on 20 April with the arrival of six de Havilland Tiger Moths.

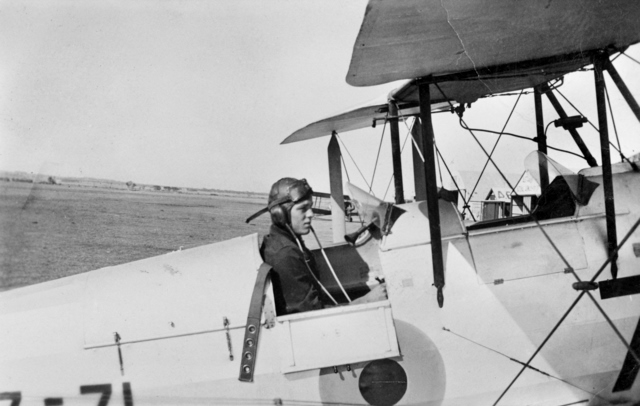
No. 1 EFTS pilot in a DH.60 Moth trainer, c. 1940

The school's inaugural EATS course, consisting of twenty-four students, commenced on 29 April 1940; all but one of the students graduated. Five more Tiger Moths arrived on 25 June. On 22 July, three aircraft belonging to the South Australian Aero Club were pressed into service, and training by the club ceased. No. 1 EFTS received three CAC Wackett Trainers on 26 June 1941. On 2 August 1941, control of the school was transferred from Southern Area Command, which had been formed in March 1940, to the newly established No. 1 (Training) Group. As of December 1942, No.1 EFTS had 116 students under instruction; a total of 1,184 trainees—81 air cadets and 1,043 EATS students—had passed through the school. A year later No.1 EFTS had eighty-five students under instruction and a total of 1,628 had passed through.

No. 1 EFTS relocated to Tamworth, New South Wales, during 17–28 May 1944, reportedly to allow for the expansion of civil aviation at Parafield. Training units in New South Wales came under the control of No. 2 (Training) Group. On 10 September, a student was killed when his Tiger Moth crashed south of Tamworth aerodrome. All flying training at No. 1 EFTS came to an end on 15 September, by which time a total of 1,991 students had passed through the school. Pilots still undergoing instruction were posted to No. 8 Elementary Flying School at Narrendera, New South Wales, and No. 11 Elementary Flying School at Benalla, Victoria. The RAAF had ordered the school's closure in August 1944 as part of a general reduction in aircrew training, after being informed by the British Air Ministry that it no longer required EATS graduates for the war in Europe. Significant reserves of trained Commonwealth aircrew had been built up in the UK early in 1944 prior to the invasion of Normandy, but lower-than-anticipated casualties had resulted in an over-supply that by 30 June numbered 3,000 Australians. No. 1 EFTS was officially disbanded on 12 December 1944. Care and Maintenance Unit (CMU) Tamworth was formed the same day, utilising some of No. 1 EFTS's staff. It was one of many CMUs that the RAAF raised for the storage and upkeep of surplus aircraft prior to their disposal after the war. CMU Tamworth was disbanded on 5 July 1947.

== Commanding officers ==
No. 1 EFTS was commanded by the following officers:

From	Name
6 November 1939	Squadron Leader F.J.B. Wight
25 November 1940	Wing Commander R.S. Brown
4 May 1942	Wing Commander Kilby
3 July 1942	Squadron Leader R. Williams
7 December 1942	Squadron Leader W.O. Wedgwood
7 June 1943	Wing Commander H. Plumridge
30 May 1944	Wing Commander C.E. Martin
