= Fiddens Wharf =

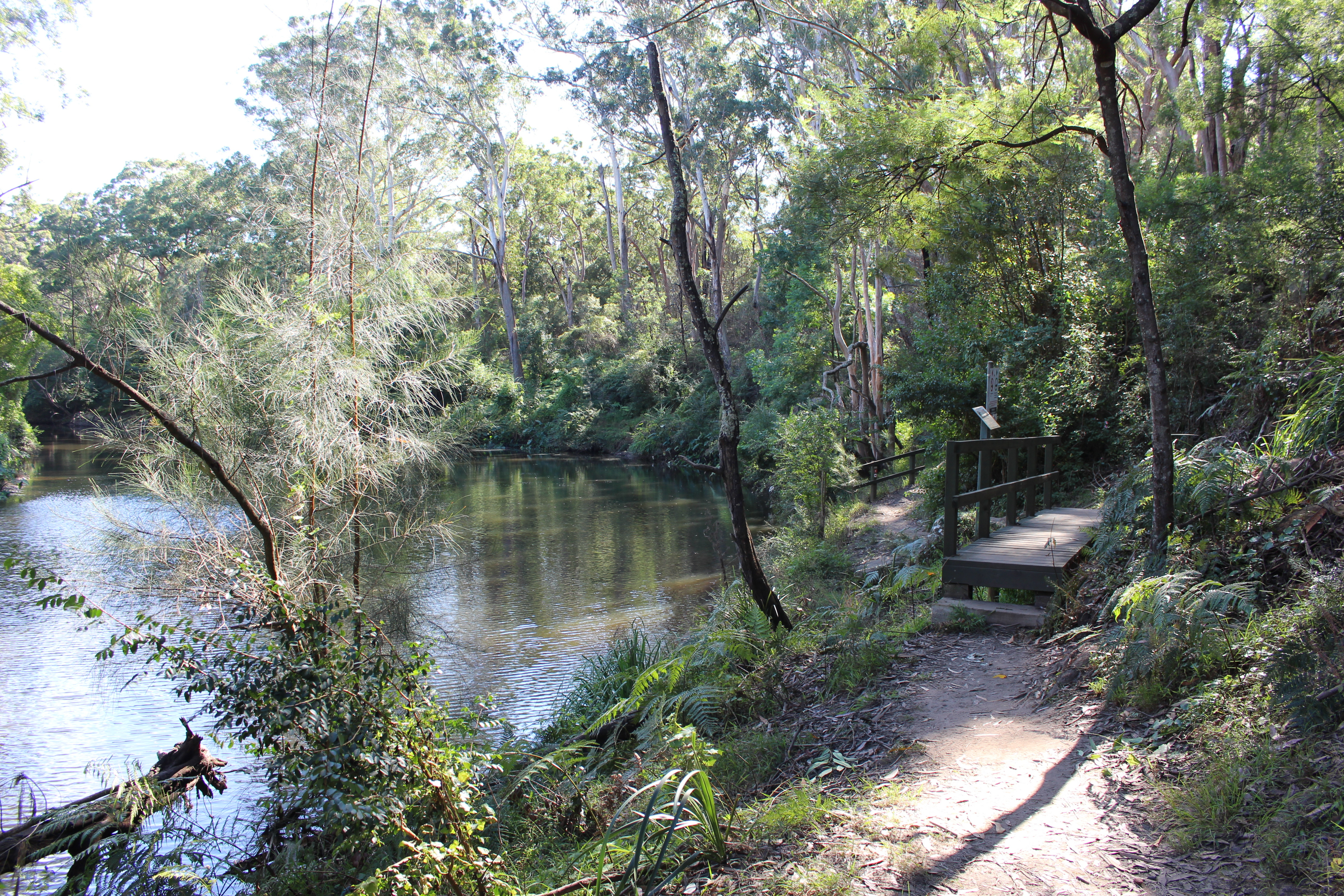
- the site of Fiddens Wharf

- Location within New South Wales
- 33.783283°S 151.144643°E
- Location: Lane Cove National Park, Killara, Sydney, New South Wales, Australia

Site notes
- Elevation: 5

Fiddens Wharf or Killara Wharf was a former wharf on the Lane Cove River in Sydney, Australia. Named after the convict Joseph Fidden, the wharf was primarily used for the transport of timber and supplies to and from Sydney in the 19th century. It is unknown whether the original structure was a conventional wharf, or a mooring place with lines connected to a metal ring secured in a nearby rock. Fiddens was one of the three main wharves on the river.

== Indigenous History ==
The traditional custodians of the land near Fiddens Wharf are the Dharug people.

== Early European History ==
In 1788, Captain Arthur Phillip was aware of timber resources on the north shore, in the area now known as Ku-ring-gai. By 1789 a detailed survey of the river up to De Burghs Bridge was made. Marine Lieutenant Ralph Clark explored the area in 1790. In 1805 George Caley explored the area, finding stands of blackbutt and blue gum. The first Europeans to inhabit this area were convict timber cutters and their overseers, who set up camp around 1805 near the end of Fiddens Wharf Road. Sawpits, huts, a wharf and well were constructed. Between 1805 and 1809, a government sawmill and convict timber-getting camp was established on Lane Cove River near a place that is now known as Fidden’s Wharf. In 1814, 48 convicts and one overseer worked at the site. Even then, much of the best timber had been cut out. This site was disbanded about 1819. One of the early convict loggers was William Henry, known as Loyal Henry.

In the 1820s illegal timber workers set up camp at Fiddens Wharf. Described as "armed ruffians, murderers, cattle stealers, bushrangers and the very worst of characters". The logs were brought down to the wharf by bullock dray.

On 5 April 1821, Governor Lachlan Macquarie issued five crown grants of land in the area that now comprises Killara, which included 40 acres to Joseph Fidden. Over two decades much timber was cut, including blackbutt and ironbark, stringy bark and blue gum, the last two types highly regarded by Macquarie for building and flooring. Billy Blue was another boatman who traveled to the wharf. A track was formed by 1813, now known as Fiddens Wharf road. In 1831 it was recorded that three sheds and a garden were above Fiddens Wharf. Residents named were boatmen Joseph Fidden, Thomas Elyard and William Bowles. The Lane Cove Sawmill Company was established just up the hill on Fiddens Wharf Road.

== Geography ==
A number of different plant communities were found near Fiddens Wharf. The early logging occurred in the Sydney Sandstone Gully Forest and Sydney Blue Gum High Forest. Soils in these forests are derived from Ashfield Shale and Hawkesbury Sandstone from the Triassic. In the Fiddens Wharf area Eocene alluvium and relatively high rainfall enabled large trees to grow. The blackbutt is the predominant species. The dwarf plum pine is a common Gondwanan relict at the site today. Six and a half hectares of forest around Fiddens wharf was declared a wharf reserve, where no timber could be legally cut. Regular fire discouraged rainforest plant species and favoured the eucalyptus trees. Many large blackbutt trees today remain in this area.

== Joseph Fidden ==
Joseph Fidden was born in Birmingham, England around 1778. Though some references state his birth year was 1757. Convicted at Kent Assizes in 1799 for burglary and stealing two pots of paint and two loaves of bread. Sentenced to death by hanging, which was commuted to seven years transportation. He arrived in Sydney Cove on the Earl Cornwallis on 6 June 1801. Fidden purchased his own land at Killara in 1821. Fidden gained his freedom and lived in the area for 25 years as a farmer and ferryman. He is said to have been a man of considerable strength and rowed "tons of sawn timber with the tide down the river" to Circular Quay, and then "return with the tide, delivering supplies to farms along the way". On the return journey, he dropped off supplies to settlements upriver. The sly-grog and other products he provided attracted the rough-living sawyers and bushmen of the district. In 1807 Fidden married Mary Clark at St John's Parramatta, they had four children. He died on 17 April 1856. Buried in Camperdown Cemetery.

== After the logging ==
In the 1850s, when the local timber was exhausted, the area near Fiddens Wharf was planted with citrus trees. The fruit were sent to the city by boat for sale. Lane Cove Road became the main route for delivery to Sydney, and the commercial importance of Fiddens wharf diminished. The citrus plantation failed due to soil deterioration, bushfires, pest and fungal disease. Fiddens Wharf eventually became a popular picnic spot. The cleared area near the river was an attractive area for recreation. Many boats from the city visited the area for day trips and camping. Vessels such as the "Native Rose", "Killara" and "Nellie" were often seen on the river.

== 20th century ==
A new wharf was built in 1908. Picnics via flat-bottomed boat to Fiddens Wharf continued in the 20th century, sometimes over 3,000 people per day traveled up river to Fiddens Wharf or Fairyland, downstream. Stone steps were built from the river to Fiddens Wharf road during the 1930s by unemployed men. They swam and fished by day. At night they distilled alcohol and gambled playing two up. Some slept under overhangs in the sandstone rocks. Their rock carvings may be seen today in rock ledges by the river bank. In 1937, a weir downstream of Fiddens Wharf was built on the river which stopped tidal boats from reaching Fiddens Wharf. In the summer of 1938–1939, 10,000 scouts from all over the world came to nearby Bradfield Park for the Australasian Scout Jamboree. The wharf area and river were prominent in their outdoor activities. During World War II, the nearby area uphill from the wharf was used by the air force. Wooden buildings were constructed near the wharf, and trenches were dug in the nearby hillside. A new wharf structure at the river was built by the air force at the site of the original wharf in the 1940s, for swimming and diving. The new wharf was 60 feet long with stairs and a pathway leading to an ablution block. A sporting ground was built in 1966 near the wharf on the site of a small military training camp. This same area was used for logging purposes and picnics in the 19th century.

== 21st century ==
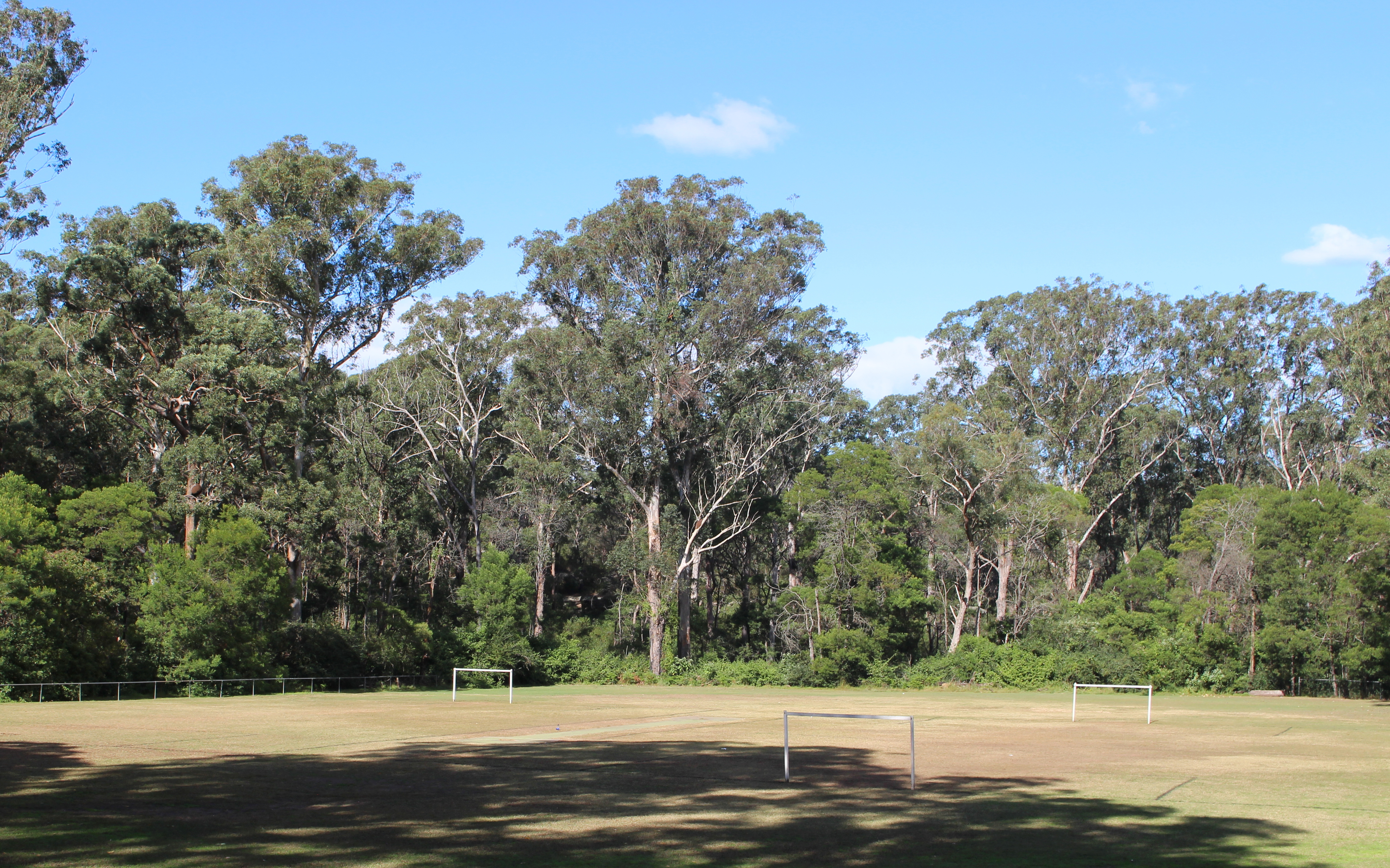
Blackbutt trees & Fiddens Wharf oval

Practically no evidence of the wharf or the military remains today. Though some refuge material near the river may be part of the air force ablution block. Despite many years of bush regeneration, the area near Fiddens Wharf is infested with invasive weeds. Fiddens Wharf is on the Great North Walk. There is a historic walkway beside the steep driveway down to the oval, it was built by convicts part of Kuring-gai's first road and has over 100 large rock slabs as steps. At the end of the steps is the oval and to the right is Lane Cove River where there is portion of river bank turned into a small deep water beach from all the logs sliding into the river. The oval is used for various activities such as football and cricket.

== Historical image ==
"Killara wharf at upper Lane Cove River". NSW State Archives- records.nsw.gov.au.
