= No. 4 Elementary Flying Training School RAAF =

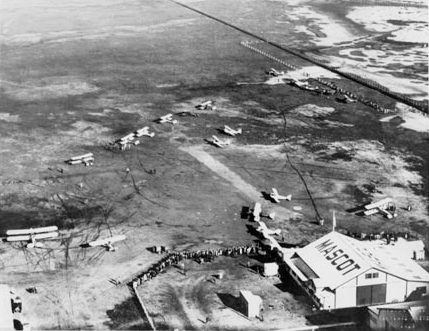
- Mascot, home of No. 4 Elementary Flying Training School
- Active: 1940–42
- Country: Australia
- Branch: Royal Australian Air Force
- Role: Introductory flying training
- Garrison/HQ: Mascot, New South Wales
- Service: World War II

Aircraft flown
- Trainer: Tiger Moth; Gipsy Moth

No. 4 Elementary Flying Training School (No. 4 EFTS) was a Royal Australian Air Force (RAAF) pilot training unit that operated during World War II. It was one of twelve elementary flying training schools employed by the RAAF to provide introductory flight instruction to new pilots as part of Australia's contribution to the Empire Air Training Scheme. No. 4 EFTS was established in January 1940 at Mascot, New South Wales, and initially operated in conjunction with civilian flying organisations based at Mascot and Newcastle. The school was disbanded in April 1942, and its operations transferred to No. 6 Elementary Flying School at Tamworth.

== History ==
Flying instruction in the Royal Australian Air Force (RAAF) underwent major changes following the outbreak of World War II, in response to a vast increase in the number of aircrew volunteers and the commencement of Australia's participation in the Empire Air Training Scheme (EATS). The Air Force's pre-war pilot training facility, No. 1 Flying Training School at RAAF Station Point Cook, Victoria, was supplanted in 1940–41 by twelve elementary flying training schools (EFTS) and eight service flying training schools (SFTS). The EFTS provided a twelve-week introductory flying course to personnel who had graduated from one of the RAAF's initial training schools. Flying training was undertaken in two stages: the first involved four weeks of instruction (including ten hours of flying) to determine trainees' suitability to become pilots. Those that passed this grading process then received a further eight weeks of training (including sixty-five hours of flying) at the EFTS. Pilots who successfully completed this course were posted to an SFTS in either Australia or Canada for the next stage of their instruction as military aviators.

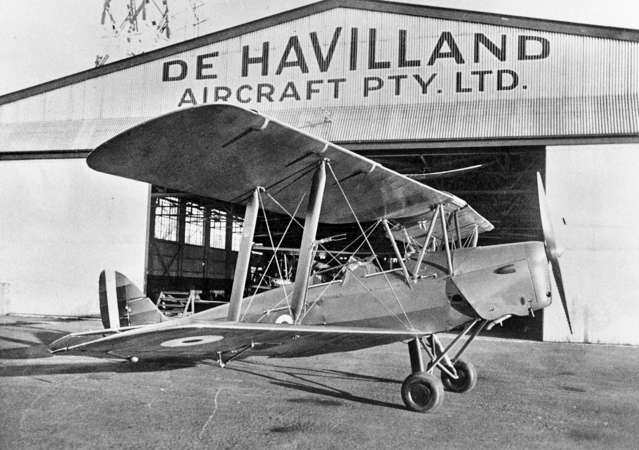
Tiger Moth trainer in front of the De Havilland hangar at Mascot prior to delivery to the RAAF, 1940

No. 4 Elementary Flying Training School (No. 4 EFTS) was formed at Kingsford Smith Aerodrome, Mascot, New South Wales, on 2 January 1940, and came under the control of No. 2 Group. Its inaugural commanding officer was Squadron Leader A.W.L. Ellis. Mascot had been Sydney's civil airport since 1920, and was home to several private aviation organisations. It was the airfield's position as the hub of civilian flight instruction in New South Wales that led to it becoming the base for the fourth flying school the RAAF raised during World War II. The same principle was followed in basing No. 1 EFTS at Parafield, South Australia, No. 2 EFTS at Archerfield, Queensland, and No. 3 EFTS at Essendon, Victoria.

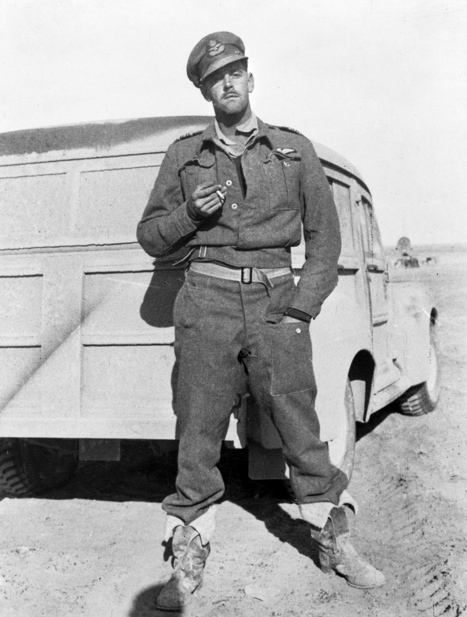
Flight Lieutenant Clive Caldwell, a graduate of No. 4 EFTS who became Australia's top-scoring fighter ace of World War II, in the Middle East, December 1941

The first training courses at No. 4 EFTS were not conducted under the auspices of EATS but by civil organisations under government contract. The instructors from these organisations were commissioned as officers in the RAAF. The flying school was divided into four flights: "A" (training conducted by the Royal Aero Club of New South Wales), "B" (conducted by Kingsford Smith Air Services Pty Ltd), "C" (conducted by Airflite Pty Ltd), and "D" (conducted at Newcastle by the Newcastle Aero Club). The training aircraft were de Havilland Tiger Moths and Gipsy Moths. All air cadets were subject to RAAF discipline, and the school's training program was directed by the commanding officer. The initial intake of twenty-four students arrived on 8 January 1940. Accommodation was severely limited at the new flying school: No. 4 EFTS headquarters was housed in the clubhouse of the Royal Aero Club, the base sick quarters utilised the Department of Civil Aviation's casualty room, and cadets had to pay for their own rooms at the nearby Brighton-Le-Sands Hotel.

No. 4 EFTS's strength as at 1 February 1940 was four officers, twenty-one airmen, one civilian, and twenty-four cadets. The second intake of twenty-four cadets arrived four days later. The school's inaugural EATS course commenced on 29 April. The government's contracts with the civilian organisations for flying instruction at Mascot and Newcastle were terminated during August 1940, and their aircraft—fifteen Tiger Moths and eight Gipsy Moths—were impressed by the RAAF. Airflite was engaged to provide maintenance. On 18 November, an instructor was killed when he fell into a Randwick street from a Tiger Moth performing a slow roll after his safety harness broke; neither he nor his student, who though badly shaken was able to land the plane, were wearing parachutes. One Tiger Moth landed on top of another on 27 December; both planes were badly damaged but no-one was killed.

No. 4 EFTS's strength as at 1 February 1941 was twenty officers, 101 airmen, and sixty-two aircrew trainees. Two Tiger Moths collided over the Lakes Golf Club on 6 April, killing the instructor and his pupil in one of the aircraft; the pilots of the other plane survived after crash-landing on the golf course. Owing to urgent requirements to house elements of the United States Army Forces in Australia (USAFIA), No. 4 EFTS was disbanded on 24 April 1942, and its operations transferred to No. 6 Elementary Flying School at Tamworth, New South Wales. No. 4 EFTS's graduates included Clive Caldwell, who became Australia's top-scoring fighter ace of World War II.

== Commanding officers ==
No. 4 EFTS was commanded by the following officers:

From	Name
2 January 1940	Squadron Leader A.W.L. Ellis
7 June 1941	Flight Lieutenant R.S. Nichol
