= West Lindfield, New South Wales =

West Lindfield, New South Wales may refer to:

- the western section of Lindfield, New South Wales
- the suburb of Bradfield, New South Wales, absorbed by Lindfield in 1977
