= Bundaberg Airport =

Airport in Queensland, Australia

Bundaberg Airport Bundaberg Regional Airport
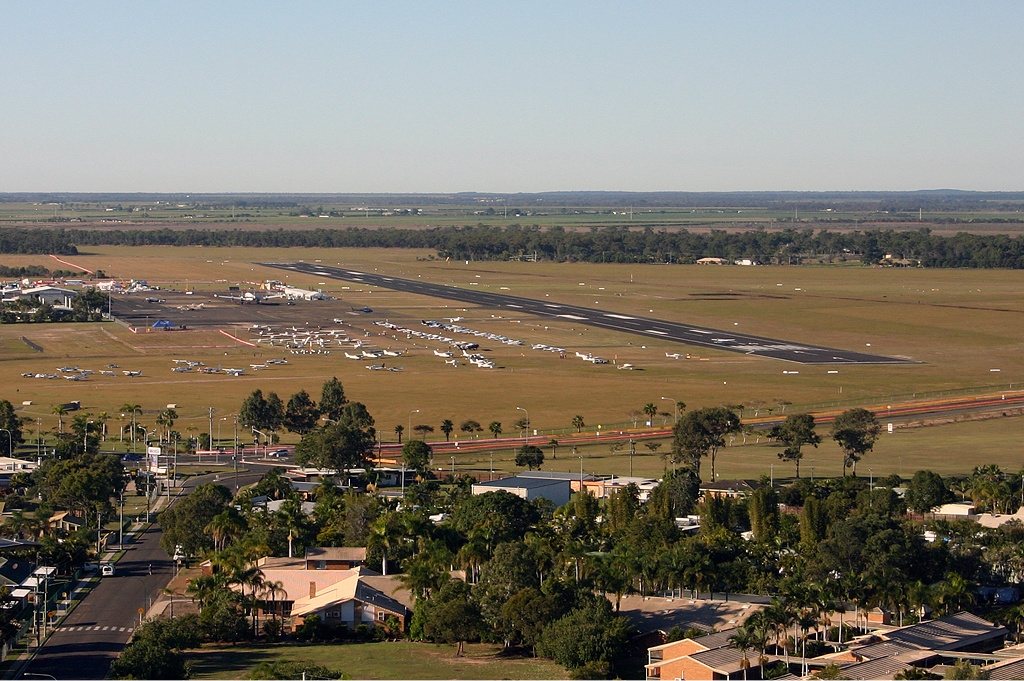
- Bundaberg Airport during an air show in 2005
- IATA: BDB; ICAO: YBUD

Summary
- Airport type: Public
- Owner/Operator: Bundaberg Regional Council
- Serves: Bundaberg, Queensland, Australia
- Opened: 12 December 1931 (94 years ago)
- Elevation AMSL: 107 ft (33 m)
- Coordinates: 24°54′14″S 152°19′07″E
- Website: bundaberg.qld.gov.au/airport

Map
- Location in Queensland

Runways
Direction	Length		Surface
Direction	m	ft	Surface
14/32	2,000	6,562	Asphalt
07/25	1,128	3,701	Grass/Clay

Statistics (2024-25)
- Revenue passengers: 140,649
- Aircraft movements: 3,535
- Sources: Australian AIP and aerodrome chart Passengers and movements from BITRE

Bundaberg Airport (IATA: BDB, ICAO: YBUD) is a regional airport serving Bundaberg, a city in the Australian state of Queensland. It is located 2.5 nautical miles (4.6 km; 2.9 mi) southwest of the city centre, on North Childers Road and Takalvan Street. The airport is owned and operated by the Bundaberg Regional Council. It is also known as Bundaberg Regional Airport.

The Royal Flying Doctor Service has one of its nine Queensland bases at Bundaberg Airport.

The Bundaberg Regional Council conducted major works on the runway, terminal, carpark and navigation aids in 2009–10 in an attempt to attract services using larger jet airliners.

== History ==
Bundaberg Airport was officially opened on 12 December 1931, by the Minister for Trade and Customs, Frank Forde, as a civilian aerodrome. The aerodrome was renamed in 1936 to Hinkler Airport after Bundaberg's famous pioneering aviator Bert Hinkler.

=== World War II ===
With the outbreak of World War II, it was decided as part of the British Commonwealth Air Training Plan to requisition Bundaberg Airport and develop it as a Royal Australian Air Force (RAAF) Flying Training School.

Known as RAAF Station Bundaberg it was initially used in 1941 by No. 12 Elementary Flying Training School RAAF (12 EFTS), until that unit relocated to Lowood Aerodrome (located at Tarampa) on 12 January 1942. No. 8 Service Flying Training School RAAF then operated from the base.

==== Units based at Bundaberg ====
- No. 32 Squadron RAAF ('B' Flight) – 1 May 1943 – 4 September 1944
- No. 66 Squadron RAAF – 20 May 1943 – 6 January 1944
- No. 71 Squadron RAAF ('B' Flight) – 1 May 1942 – 26 January 1943
- No. 8 Service Flying Training School RAAF – 14 December 1941 – 25 July 1945
- No. 12 Elementary Flying Training School RAAF – 16 October 1941 – 12 January 1942
- No. 88 Operational Base Unit RAAF – 14 June 1945 – 26 April 1946
- Royal Netherlands East Indies Army Air Force Personnel and equipment pool – 25 June 1945 – 26 April 1946.

==== Bundaberg War Graves ====
Located within the Bundaberg General Cemetery, it contains the burial places of 46 soldiers and airmen of the Australian Forces and five airmen of the United States Army Air Forces.

=== Post war ===
The Department of Civil Aviation took over Bundaberg Aerodrome on 31 July 1946. Bundaberg Regional Council took over the airport in June 1983. A new terminal was opened on 9 May 1986. A major extension to Bundaberg Airport was completed in March 2010, making the runway capable of handling jet aircraft such as the Airbus A320 and Boeing 737, and also including an expansion of the terminal.

== Facilities ==
The airport resides at an elevation of 107 ft (33 m) above sea level. It has two runways: 14/32 with an asphalt surface measuring 2,000 m × 30 m (6,562 ft × 98 ft) and 07/25 with a grassed grey silt clay surface measuring 1,128 m × 30 m (3,701 ft × 98 ft).

== Airlines and destinations ==
Airlines	Destinations
Link Airways	Brisbane
QantasLink	Brisbane

Link Airways operates services between Bundaberg and Brisbane; QantasLink also has flights from the airport.

In October 1966, Trans Australian Airlines was granted permission to use the airport despite protestations from Ansett Transport Industries, parent of Bundaberg Airport’s hitherto main operator Queensland Airlines.

In July 2017, Alliance Airlines commenced operating services in co-operation with Virgin Australia from Brisbane after the latter ceased ATR 72 operations in Queensland. Alliance Airlines withdrew from Bundaberg in September 2020.

In May 2023, Bonza commenced operating a twice-weekly service from Melbourne. The service ceased in April 2024 after Bonza was placed in voluntary administration.

== Statistics ==
Bundaberg Airport was ranked 40th in Australia for the number of revenue passengers served in financial year 2024–2025.

Annual passenger and aircraft statistics for Bundaberg
Year	Revenue passengers	Aircraft movements
2015-16	167,178	4,020
2016–17	174,160	3,885
2017–18	169,482	3,500
2018–19	156,309	3,445
2019–20	115,527	2,791
2020–21	61,846	1,506
2021–22	82,101	1,790
2022–23	117,191	2,742
2023–24	165,224	3,614
2024–25	140,649	3,535

== See also ==
- List of airports in Queensland
