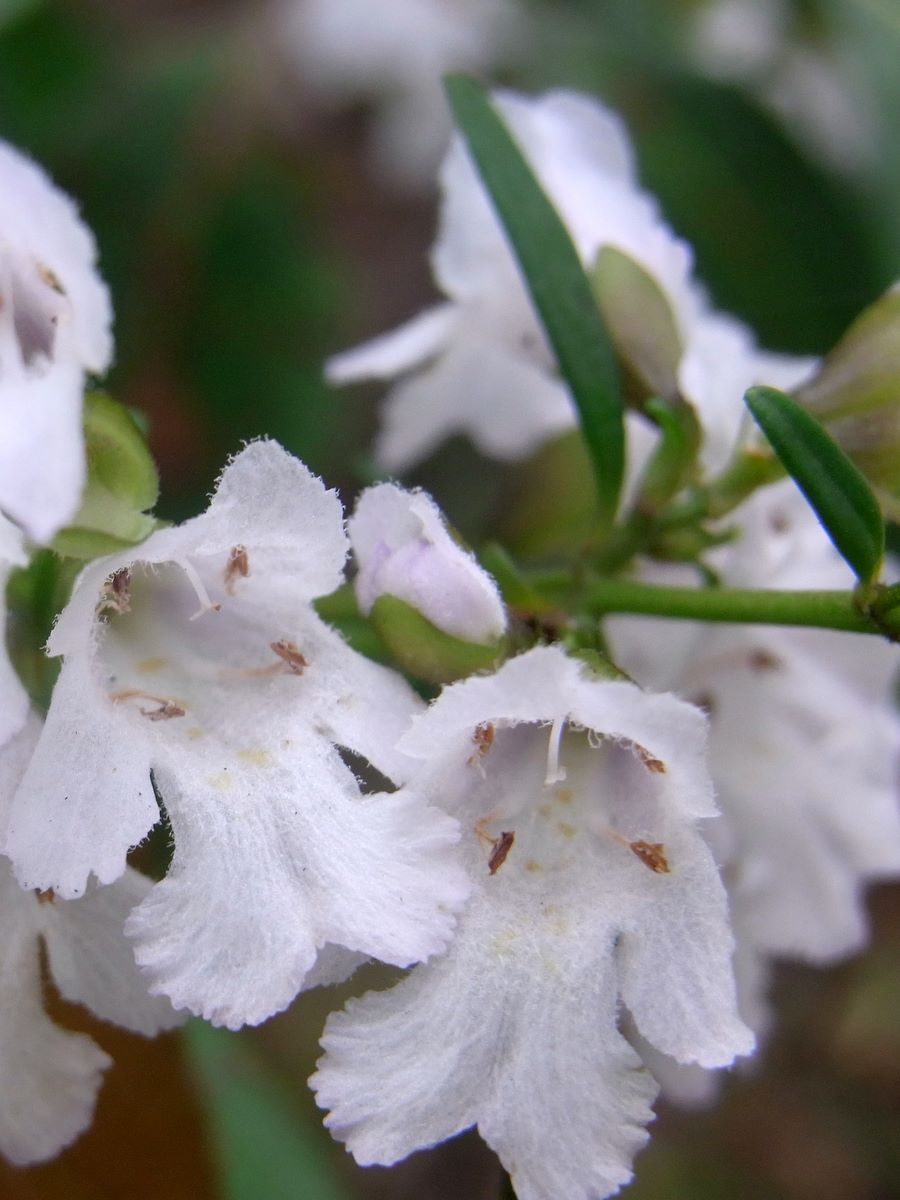
- In Lane Cove National Park

Scientific classification
- Kingdom: Plantae
- Clade: Tracheophytes
- Clade: Angiosperms
- Clade: Eudicots
- Clade: Asterids
- Order: Lamiales
- Family: Lamiaceae
- Genus: Prostanthera
- Species: P. linearis

Binomial name
- Prostanthera linearis R.Br.
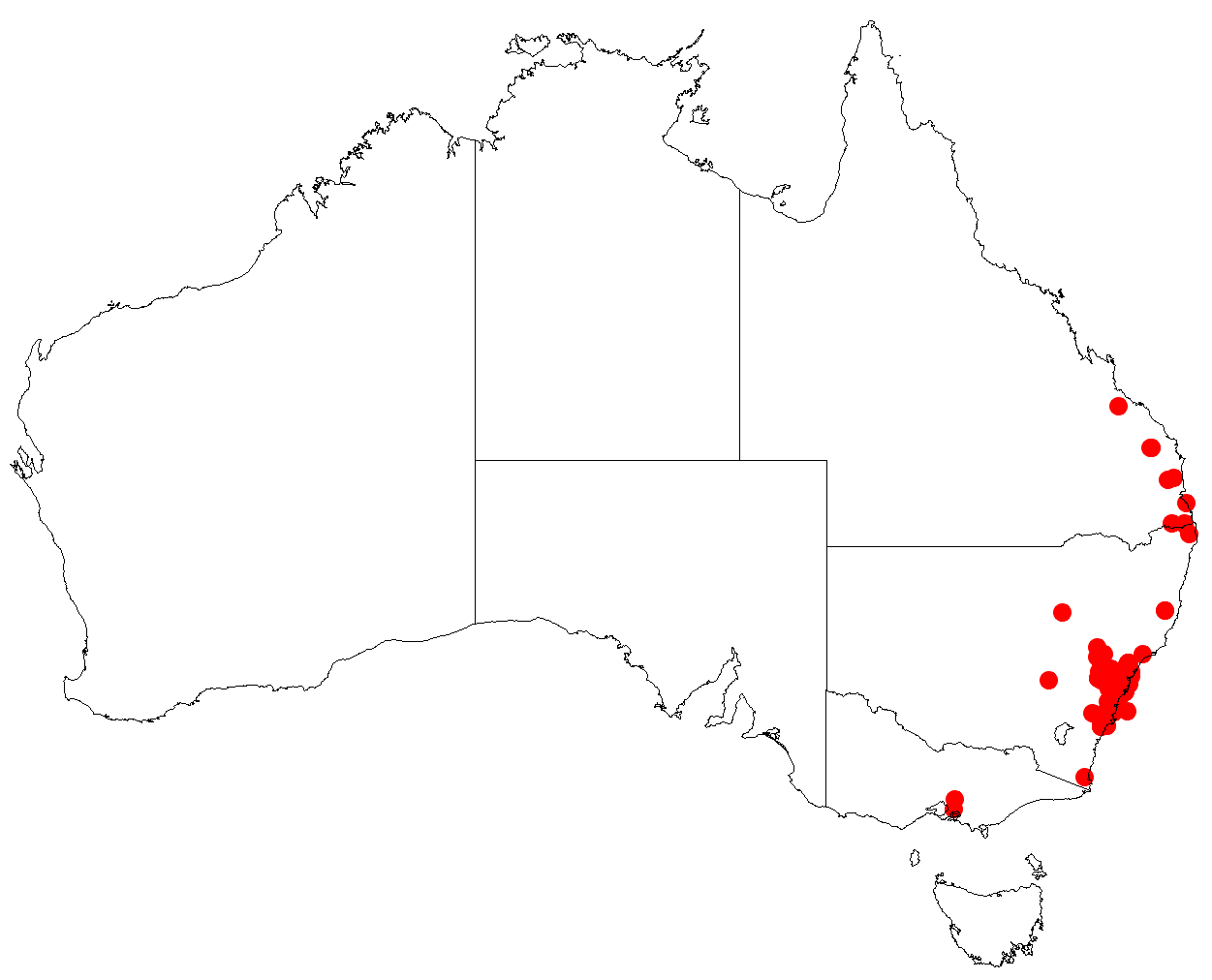
- Occurrence data from AVH

= Prostanthera linearis =

Narrow-leaved mint-bush

Species of flowering plant

Prostanthera linearis, commonly known as narrow-leaved mint-bush is a species of flowering plant in the family Lamiaceae and is endemic to eastern Australia. It is an erect, faintly aromatic shrub with glabrous, narrow egg-shaped to linear leaves and white flowers that are often tinged with pinkish-mauve.

== Description ==
Prostanthera linearis is an erect shrub that typically grows to a height of 1–3 m (3 ft 3 in – 9 ft 10 in) and is faintly aromatic. It has glabrous narrow egg-shaped to linear leaves that are 15–45 mm (0.59–1.77 in) long and 2–3 mm (0.079–0.118 in) wide on a petiole less than 2 mm (0.079 in) long. The flowers are arranged in leaf axils near the ends of branchlets with bracteoles 2–3 mm (0.079–0.118 in) long at the base. The sepals are 5.5–6 mm (0.22–0.24 in) long forming a tube 2–3 mm (0.079–0.118 in) long with two lobes, the upper lobe 2.5–3 mm (0.098–0.118 in) long. The petals are 8–12 mm (0.31–0.47 in) long and white, often with tinged with pinkish-mauve.

== Taxonomy ==
Prostanthera linearis was first formally described in 1810 by Robert Brown in his book Prodromus Florae Novae Hollandiae. The specific epithet (linearis) refers to the shape of the leaves.

== Distribution and habitat ==
Narrow-leaved mint-bush grows in eucalyptus forest, often by streams in sandy or gravelly clay soils and occurs in Queensland and from Sydney, south to Milton.

== Conservation status ==
This mintbush is classified as of "least concern" under the Queensland Government Nature Conservation Act 1992.
