= No. 67 Squadron RAAF =

Royal Australian Air Force squadron

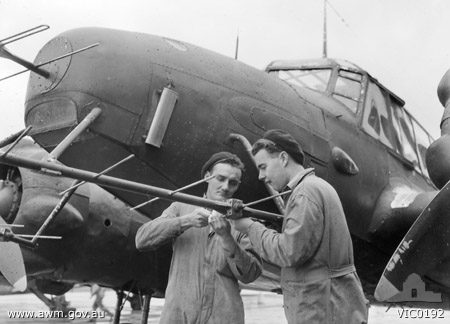
- Ground crew adjust a No. 67 Squadron Avro Anson's radar in 1945
- Active: 1943–1945
- Country: Australia
- Branch: Royal Australian Air Force
- Role: Maritime patrol
- Engagements: World War II

Insignia
- Squadron code: MK

Aircraft flown
- Patrol: Anson

No. 67 Squadron was a Royal Australian Air Force (RAAF) maritime patrol squadron of World War II. It was formed in January 1943, conducted patrols off the southern Australian coastline until the end of the war, and was disbanded in November 1945.

== History ==
During the first half of 1943 Japanese submarines operated off the Australian east coast, sinking 16 ships and damaging several more. In response to these losses the Australian Government expanded the military's anti-submarine warfare (ASW) forces. Three new RAAF maritime patrol units equipped with Avro Anson training aircraft, No. 66, No. 67 and No. 71 squadrons, were raised during this expansion. While it was recognised that the Ansons lacked sufficient range and payload to be effective in the ASW role, superior aircraft were not available.

No. 67 Squadron was formed at RAAF Base Laverton on 6 January 1943 with a strength of 180 personnel and 14 Ansons. The squadron operated from Laverton and several other bases in Victoria to escort convoys and conduct anti-submarine patrols. It was later organised into two flights which operated alternately from Laverton and Mallacoota. In March 1944 the squadron reached a strength of 244 personnel and 17 Ansons.

The squadron made a number of possible submarine sightings during the first months of 1943. Aircrew reported sighting submarines on 1, 11, 16 and 21 February but none of these boats were attacked. On 11 April a No. 67 Squadron aircraft was escorting Convoy OC86 when it was attacked by Japanese submarine I-26, but did not sight the attacker. The next day two No. 67 Squadron Ansons protected the minesweeper HMAS Orara by attacking a submarine which they believed they had sighted near the ship.

No. 67 Squadron continued to conduct uneventful patrols off southern Australia until the end of the war. In addition to its main ASW task, it also conducted searches for missing aircraft and vessels and participated in naval and army co-operation exercises in Victoria and Tasmania. An unusual task undertaken by the squadron was providing aircraft for a Council for Scientific and Industrial Research survey of pelagic fish between Sydney and Ceduna from 21 to 24 April 1945. No. 67 Squadron was demobilised rapidly after Japan's surrender, with the squadron being declared non-operational on 17 August 1945 and its disbandment completed on 10 November that year.
