= No. 66 Squadron RAAF =

Royal Australian Air Force squadron

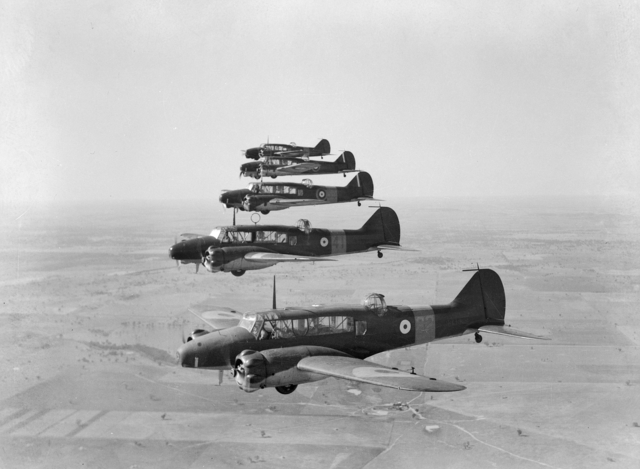
- RAAF Avro Ansons similar to those used by No. 66 Squadron
- Active: 1943–1944
- Country: Australia
- Branch: Royal Australian Air Force
- Role: Maritime patrol
- Engagements: World War II

Insignia
- Squadron code: JN

Aircraft flown
- Patrol: Anson; Beaufort (attached)

No. 66 Squadron was a Royal Australian Air Force (RAAF) maritime patrol squadron of World War II. It was formed in May 1943 as an emergency measure and disbanded in January 1944.

== History ==
During the first half of 1943 Japanese submarines operated off the Australian east coast, sinking 16 ships and damaging several more. In response to these losses the Australian Government expanded the military's anti-submarine warfare (ASW) forces. Three new RAAF maritime patrol units equipped with Avro Anson training aircraft, No. 66, No. 67 and No. 71 squadrons, were raised during this expansion. While it was recognised that the Ansons lacked sufficient range and payload to be effective in the ASW role, superior aircraft were not available.

No. 66 Squadron was formed at RAAF Station Bundaberg, Queensland, on 20 May 1943 from elements of No. 8 Service Flying Training School, and was the last of the three new Anson-equipped squadrons to be raised. It received its first Ansons on 2 July, began flight training on 26 July and conducted its first operational patrol the next day. Pilots from the squadron ferried more Ansons from RAAF Base Laverton to Bundaberg in early August, and it reached a strength of 18 aircraft on the 8th of that month. A flight of Beaufort aircraft from No. 32 Squadron was also attached to the unit.

From late July 1943 onwards the squadron escorted Allied shipping travelling off the east coast of Australia. These patrols were uneventful, and the squadron did not sight any Japanese submarines or ships. No. 66 Squadron aircraft also exercised with Royal Australian Navy ships east of Moreton Island on 29 and 30 August. While several of the squadron's Ansons were involved in accidents, only one was written off. In November 1943 the Government decided to reduce the military's ASW force as no Japanese submarines were known to have operated off Australia since June. Accordingly, No. 66 Squadron was disbanded on 8 January 1944 and its personnel were transferred to No. 8 Service Flying School, No. 1 Operational Training Unit and No. 71 Squadron.
