= List of British Commonwealth Air Training Plan facilities in South Africa =

This article contains a list of the facilities of the Joint Air Training Scheme which was a major programme for training South African Air Force, Royal Air Force and Allied air crews during World War II.

An Elementary Flying Training School (EFTS) gave a recruit 50 hours of basic aviation instruction on a simple trainer like the Tiger Moth. Pilots who showed promise went on to training at a Service Flying Training School (STFS). The Service Flying Training School provided advanced training for pilots, including fighter and multi-engined aircraft. Other trainees went on to different specialties, such as Wireless, navigation or bombing and gunnery. In South Africa, the Elementary Flying Training School and Service Flying Training School were renamed Air Schools.

== Training schools ==
Air School	Base	Major types of aircraft	Training	Established	Opened	Disbanded	Motto	Unit publication	Comment
1 Air School	Baragwanath	Tiger Moth	Elementary flying	11 Nov 1940 (ex 1 EFTS)	30 Apr 1944	29 Feb 1944	”Start Well, Finish Well"		
2 Air School	Randfontein	Tiger Moth	Elementary flying	11 Nov 1940 (ex 2 EFTS)		2 Oct 1944	”Knowledge is Light"		
3 Air School	Wonderboom	Tiger Moth	Elementary flying	11 Nov 1940 (ex 3 EFTS)	16 Feb 1941	25 Sep 1944	”Tertius Primus Erit"		
4 Air School	Benoni	Tiger Moth	Elementary flying	11 Nov 1940 (ex 4 EFTS)	1 Sep 1941	24 Jun 1945	”Vier sal eerste wees"	”Big Ben"	
5 Air School	Witbank	Tiger Moth	Elementary flying	11 Nov 1940 (ex 5 EFTS)	13 Oct 1941	15 Dec 1944	”Wings for Victory"	”Tiger Rag"	
6 Air School	Potchefstroom	Tiger Moth	Elementary flying	11 Nov 1940 (ex 6 EFTS)	4 Aug 1941	6 Aug 1946	”Eendrag en Vryheid"	”Hotchpotch"	
7 Air School	Kroonstad	Tiger Moth	Elementary flying	22 Dec 1941	Jul 1942	16 Jan 1945	”Nil Sine Labore"	”The Dust Sheet	Buildings taken over by SA Army
21 Air School	Kimberley	Hind, Hart, Oxford	Service flying	11 Nov 1940	30 Apr 1941	1 Feb 1945	”Pro Patria"	”21"	Now Kimberley Airport
22 Air School	Vereeniging	Hind, Hart	Service flying	11 Nov 1940 (ex 2 SFTS)			”Ad Unum Ad Astra"	”Clamp"	
23 Air School	Zwartkop Air Station	Hind, Hart	Service flying	11 Nov 1940 (ex 3 SFTS)			”Superna Petimus"	”Tale-Spin"	
24 Air School	Nigel (Dunnottar)	Master, Oxford, Harvard,Hart	Service flying	11 Nov 1940	29 Jul 1941	03 Sep 1946	”Per Artem Ad Astra"		Now Dunnottar Military Base. (-26.347741, 28.459463)
25 Air School	Standerton	Hind, Hart, Master, Harvard	Service flying	11 Nov 1940 (ex 5 SFTS)			”Ex Unite Ad Victoria"		
26 Air School	Pietersburg	Hind, Hart	Service flying	11 Nov 1940			”Nemo Mortalium Omnibus Hors Sarit"		
27 Air School	Bloemspruit	Hind, Hart	Service flying	11 Nov 1940			”Finis Coronat Opus"		Now AFB Bloemspruit/Bloemfontein Airport
41 Air School	Collondale, East London	Hart variants, Battle, Northrop Nomad, Oxford, Anson	Service flying, Bombing & gunnery						Now East London Airport
42 Air School	Port Elizabeth	Battle, Northrop Nomad, Oxford, Anson, Harvard	Service flying						Located on the south side of Port Elizabeth Airport. Part preserved as SAAF museum branch, remainder used by Army
43 Air School	Port Alfred	Oxford, Anson, Harvard	Service flying						Still in use for civil flying training as 43 Air School
44 Air School	Grahamstown	Oxford, Anson, Battle	Navigation & bombing	11 Nov 1940	12 Jan 1942		"All for the Same Cause"		Taken over by SA Army, now 6 SA Inf Bn
45 Air School	Oudtshoorn	Oxford, Anson, Battle	Air Observer (Type B)	11 Nov 1940		20 Aug 1945	"Primus Inter Pares"	"Sprog"	Civil airfield & SA Army
47 Air School	Queenstown	Anson, Oxford	Air Observer (Type B)	11 Nov 1940 (ex 7 AONS)	30 Apr 1941	7 Apr 1945		"The Signal"	Civil airfield & SA Army
48 Air School	Woodbrook, East London	Tiger Moth, Tutor	Elementary navigation	14 July 1942	1 Sep 1942	1 May 1945	"Sic itur ad astra" and "Bobaas"	"B.O.N."	Now industrial area and Army base
61 Air School	George	Anson	General Reconnaissance	11 Nov 1940 (ex 1 S of GR)	30 Apr 1941	14 Jun 1945		"Duff Gen"	Civil airfield until replaced by George Airport
62 Air School	Tempe, Bloemfontein	All types	Flying Instructor Training	11 Nov 1940 (ex CFS)		19/24 Feb 1945	"Facta Nostra Vivent"		
63 Air School	Tempe, Bloemfontein		Ground Instruction	11 Nov 1940		Jan 1941		Absorbed into 75 Air School Lyttelton	
64 Air School	Tempe, Bloemfontein	Dominie, Anson	Electrical & Wireless Operator		5 Feb 1941	20 Dec 1945	"Ut Servient Discimus"	"Sparks"	
65 Air School	Youngsfield, Cape Town	Oxford, Anson, Wapiti	Air Armament	11 Nov 1940	30 Apr 1941	13 Apr 1944			Resurrected 1 Jun 1944 – 10 Sep 1945
66 Air School	Youngsfield, Cape Town	Anson, Valentia, Harvard Oxford	Navigation & bombing	11 Nov 1940	30 Apr 1941	1 Apr 1945			Became SA Army base. Latterly used to house refugees from xenophobic violence.
67 Air School	Zwartkop Air Station	DH Dragon, Envoy	Photography & Photographic Training	11 Nov 1940					Currently SAAF AFB Swartkop
68 Air School	Voortrekkerhoogte		Technical Training	11 Nov 1940 (1 STT)		1 Oct 1962			Currently an SAAF base
69 Air School	Germiston		Technical Training (Airframes & Engines)	11 Nov 1940 (ex 2 STT)		Dec 1944			Absorbed into 68 Air School
70 Air School	Alexanderfontein, Kimberley		Technical Training	11 Nov 1940 (ex 3 STT)		Sep 1943			
71 Air School	Milner Park, Johannesburg		Basic Workshop Training	11 Nov 1940 (ex 1 Basic Training Centre)		1 Feb 1945		"The Fledgling"	Now part of University of Witwatersrand campus
72 Air School	St George's Park; Port Elizabeth		WAAF Basic Training	11 Nov 1940 (ex 2 Basic Training Centre)					Situated at Park Lane junction with Park Drive, the last remaining bungalow from camp, which was home to Sea Scouts Group, has now been demolished.
73 Air School	Wonderboom, Pretoria		WAAF Technical Training	11 Nov 1940 (ex 3 Basic Training Centre)					
75 Air School	Lyttelton, Pretoria								
77 Air School	Pretoria		WAAF Basic Training	15 Jul 1942 (ex WAAF Basic Training Centre)		30 Jan 1943			
100 Air School	Voortrekkerhoogte	Regimental training							
11 Operational Training Unit	St Albans, Port Elizabeth	Kittyhawk, Hurricane	Fighter Operational Training	1 July 1943		September 1945	"Learn and Live"	"Tale-Spin" (ex 23 Air School)	
29 Operational Training Unit	Nigel	Ventura, Lodestar, Oxford, Anson	Twin engine Conversion		July 1943	June 1944			
4 Wing	Quaggaspoort	Grunau Baby, Slingsby Kirby Cadet, Minimoa	Gliding Training	1940		1943			Gliding field after the war. Later became SA Police Dog School
Air School 27 Squadron SAAF	Fisantekraal	Lockheed Ventura	Advanced flying	1943		1951 relocated AFB Ysterplaat			airfield sold in 1960 to Durbanville municipality, since 1993 in private hands with two flight schools

== Training aircraft ==
The JATS used the following types of aircraft for training:

- Airspeed AS.10 Oxford I & II
- Avro 621 Tutor
- Avro 652a Anson
- Curtiss P.40E/N Kittyhawk I, III & IV
- DH 82a Tiger Moth
- DH.89a Dominie
- Fairey Battle
- Hawker Hart (variants)
- Hawker Hurricane IIb & IIc
- Lockheed L.37 Ventura I and II
- Miles M.19 Master II
- North American Harvard I, IIa and III
- Northrop 8-A5 Nomad I

Minor aircraft types used in any significant numbers included the Curtiss H-75A-4 Mohawk IV, Hawker Hartbees, Hawker Fury, Martin167F Maryland and Westland Wapiti.

== Glossary ==
- AFB — Air Force Base
- CFS — Central Flying School
- EFTS – Elementary Flying Training School
- SAAF — South African Air Force
- SFTS – Service Flying Training School
- WAAF —Women's Auxiliary Air Force

== See also ==
- List of British Commonwealth Air Training Plan facilities in Australia
- List of British Commonwealth Air Training Plan facilities in Canada
- List of British Commonwealth Air Training Plan facilities in Southern Rhodesia
- Aircrew brevet
