= Commandment Rock =

Coordinates: 33.7888°S 151.1466°E

Commandment Rock is a large rock located in the Lane Cove National Park, Sydney, New South Wales, Australia. The site is home to rock engravings, both Aboriginal and European. An engraving of the Fifth Commandment on the rock gives it its name. It is reputed to have been carved in the late 19th century by a nearby resident, Thomas Tunbridge, as a punishment from his parents. Erosion has caused this engraving to be invisible today. Other engravings included a cannon, anchor, axe, sword, bow and arrow, and a crescent and "sunburst" motif, the only two Aboriginal engravings at the site. A sign posted near the rock depicts the engravings as they used to be.

The site is easy to access, located just next to the road, and is adjoined by a covered picnic area. However, it is not recommended to walk on the site, as this will increase the rate of erosion and destruction of the engravings.

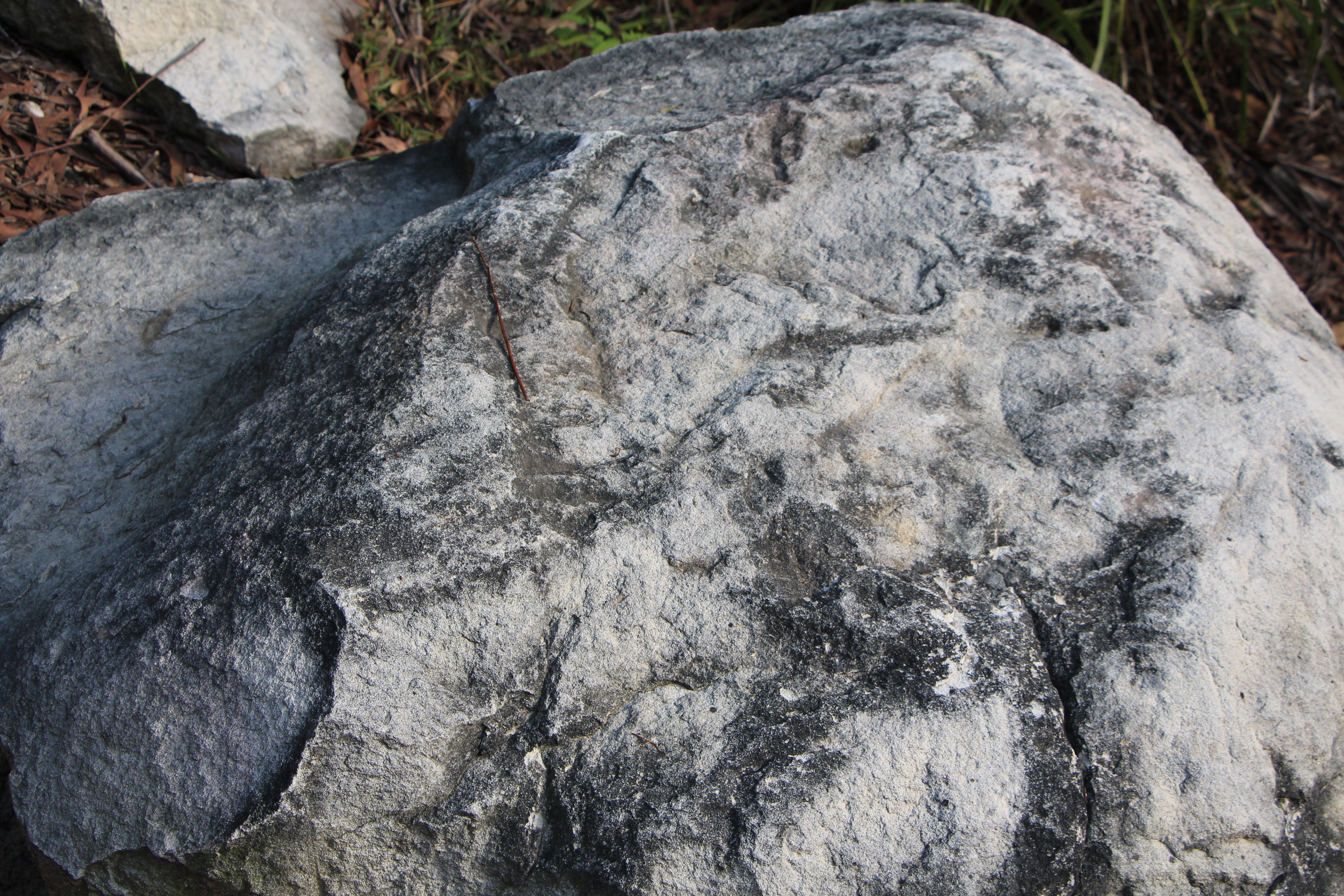
Commandment Rock showing traces of engravings lost to weathering

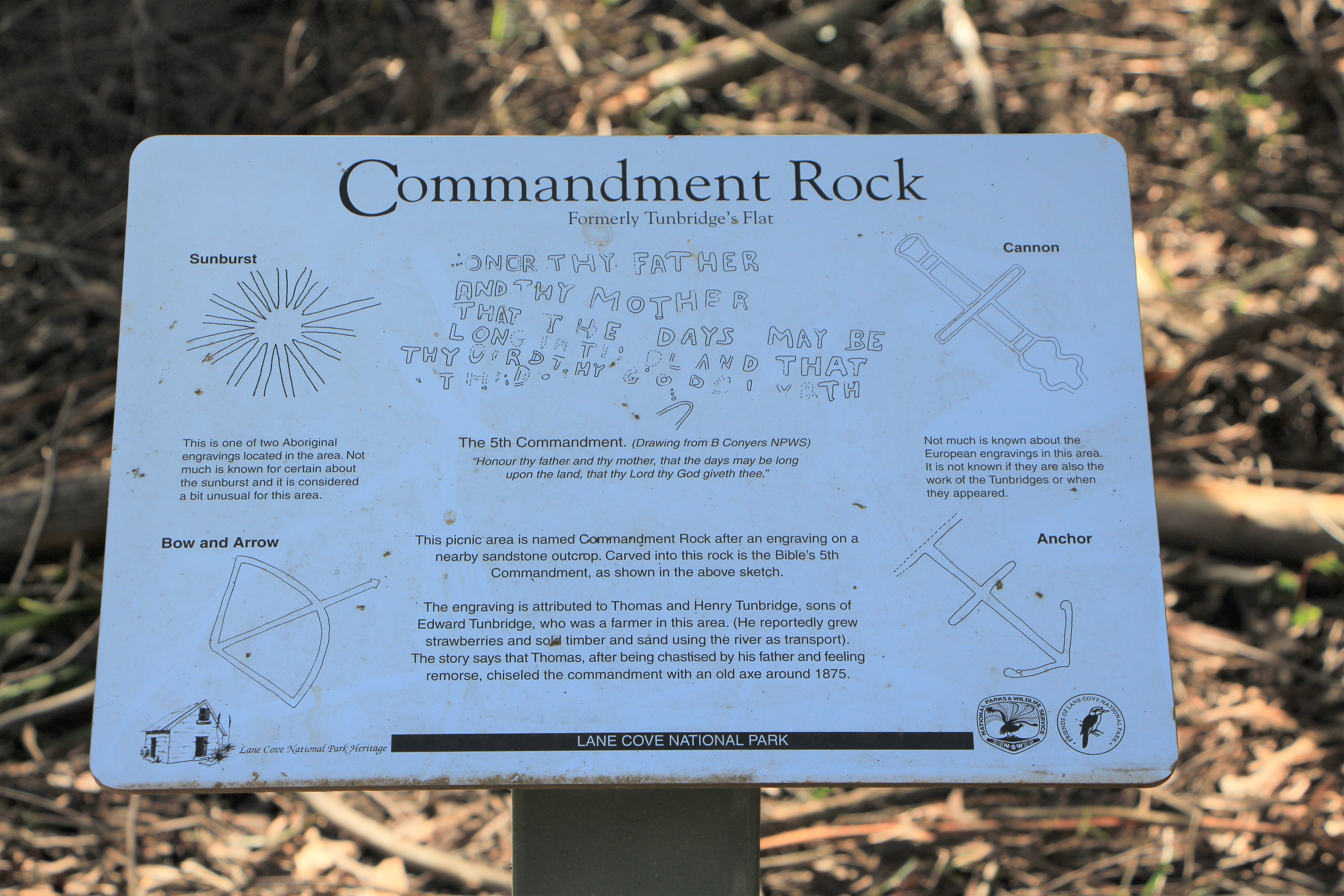
Sign showing the engravings that used to be visible on Commandment Rock

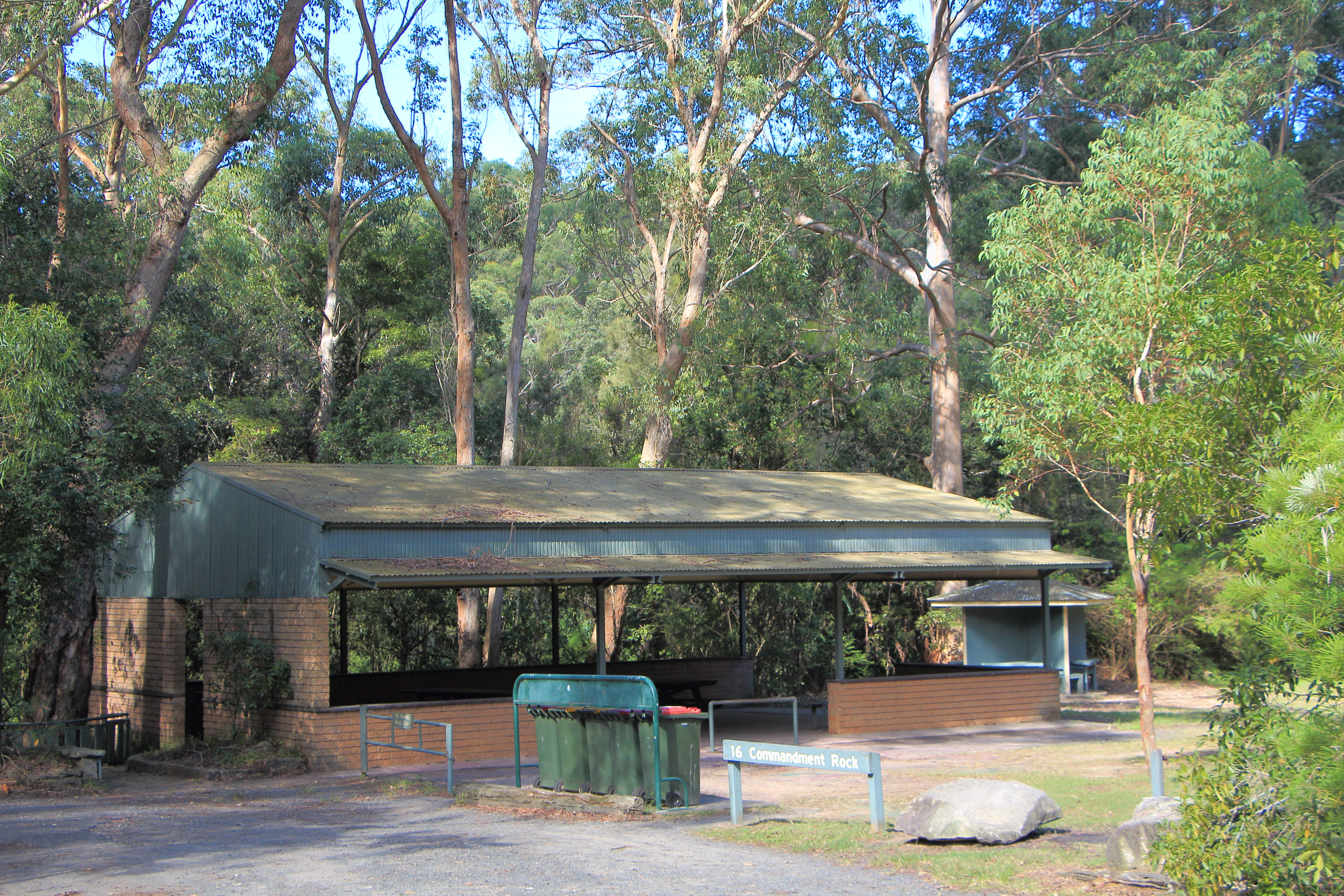
Commandment Rock picnic area

== See also ==
- List of individual rocks
