= No. 8 Service Flying Training School RAAF =

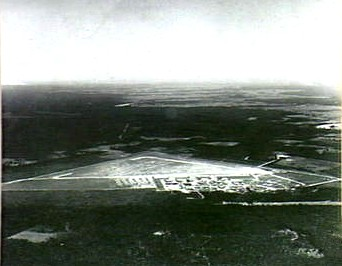
- RAAF Station Bundaberg, home of No. 8 Service Flying Training School, photographed from an Avro Anson in 1944
- Active: 1941–45
- Allegiance: Australia
- Branch: Royal Australian Air Force
- Role: Intermediate/advanced flying training
- Part of: No. 2 Training Group
- Garrison/HQ: RAAF Station Bundaberg

No. 8 Service Flying Training School (No. 8 SFTS) was a flying training school of the Royal Australian Air Force (RAAF) that operated during World War II. It was formed in December 1941, and graduated its first course in March 1942. Responsible for intermediate and advanced instruction of pilots under the Empire Air Training Scheme (EATS), the school was based at RAAF Station Bundaberg, Queensland, and operated Avro Anson aircraft. It spawned two maritime patrol squadrons in early 1943, raised in response to increased Japanese submarine activity off Australia's east coast. Some of the school's aircraft were also attached to the Australian Army in 1944–45. No. 8 SFTS completed its final training course in December 1944, and was disbanded in July 1945.

== History ==
RAAF aircrew training expanded dramatically following the outbreak of World War II, in response to Australia's participation in the Empire Air Training Scheme (EATS). The Air Force's pre-war flight training facility, No. 1 Flying Training School at RAAF Station Point Cook, Victoria, was supplanted in 1940–41 by twelve Elementary Flying Training Schools (EFTS), eight Service Flying Training Schools (SFTS), and Central Flying School (CFS). While CFS turned out new flight instructors, the EFTS provided basic training to prospective pilots who, if successful, would go on to an SFTS for further instruction that focussed on operational (or "service") flying. The course at SFTS typically consisted of two streams, intermediate and advanced, and included such techniques as instrument flying, night flying, advanced aerobatics, formation flying, dive bombing, and aerial gunnery. The total duration of training varied during the war as demand for aircrew rose and fell. Initially running for 16 weeks, the course was cut to 10 weeks (which included 75 hours flying time) in October 1940. A year later it was raised to 12 weeks (including 100 hours flying time), and again to 16 weeks two months later. It continued to increase after this, peaking at 28 weeks in June 1944.

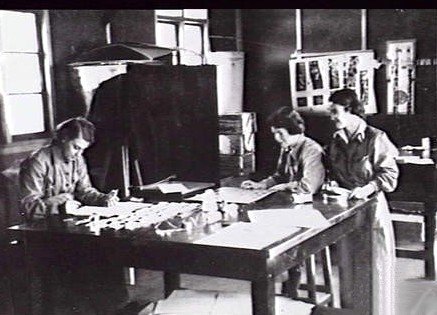
WAAAFs preparing identification photos of new entrants at No. 8 Service Flying Training School

No. 8 Service Flying Training School (No. 8 SFTS) was formed at RAAF Station Bundaberg, Queensland, on 14 December 1941, under the control of No. 2 Training Group. Its inaugural commanding officer was Wing Commander I.C.C. Thomson. The new school was reported to have cost £300,000 to establish, and joined No. 12 Elementary Flying Training School (No. 12 EFTS), which was already based—temporarily—at Bundaberg. No. 8 SFTS received its first aircraft in January 1942: 27 Avro Ansons released by other units. The same month, No. 12 EFTS transferred to its permanent home at RAAF Station Lowood. The standard intake of pilots at No. 8 SFTS each month was 50, and the initial course of students graduated in March 1942. By July that year, the total number of aircraft operated by the school had increased to 87.

Flying accidents were commonplace at training establishments and No. 8 SFTS was no exception; taxiing collisions, crash landings in the surrounding cane fields, and runway overshoots were regular occurrences. At least two aircraft were damaged each month in the early part of 1942. The school's first fatality, however, was from drowning, when staff were called out to assist victims of local flooding in February, and an aircraftman died during an attempted rescue. On 1 June 1942, an Anson crashed into the sea off Bargara, near Bundaberg; the pilot and two crew were reported as missing, believed killed. Three more aircrew were lost when an Anson apparently went down in the sea on 5 October. On 25 February 1943, an Anson crashed during a night-flying exercise, killing both pilots. The school suffered a ground fatality on 25 April 1944, when a mechanic walked into the spinning propeller of an Anson he was servicing. Two more pilots were killed when an Anson dived into the ground on 8 December, following an apparent structural failure.

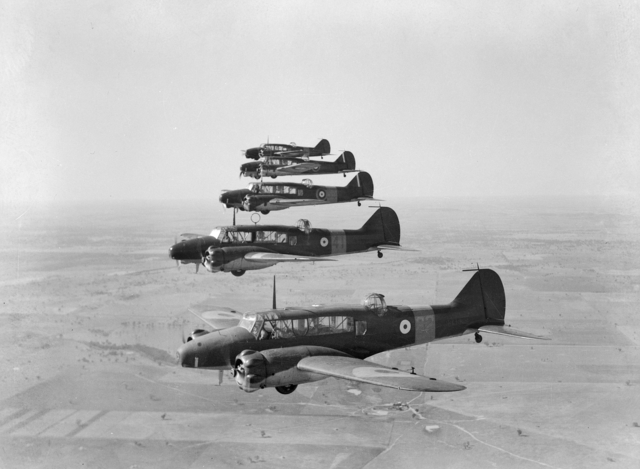
Avro Anson trainers in formation

The outbreak of the Pacific War in December 1941 had led to aircraft at many SFTSs being classified as Second Line (Reserve) aircraft in the defence of Australia. Following directions issued in May 1942, No. 71 Reserve Squadron was raised at Bundaberg, using resources allocated from No. 8 SFTS. One of the Ansons assigned to the squadron crashed on 5 June 1942 after running out of fuel in bad weather at night, killing the pilot and two crew members. In response to Japanese submarine activity off Australia's east coast, the Federal government formally established two RAAF maritime patrol units in the first half of 1943 with personnel and aircraft from No. 8 SFTS. No. 71 Squadron was formed as a separate entity to the flying school on 26 January at Lowood, maintaining detachments at RAAF Stations Bundaberg and Amberley in Queensland, as well as at Richmond and, later, Coffs Harbour in New South Wales. No. 66 Squadron was formed at Bundaberg on 20 May. The squadrons undertook anti-submarine, convoy escort, search-and-rescue, and army/naval cooperation duties. With the lessening of Japanese submarine activity towards the end of 1943, the staff and aircraft of No. 66 Squadron were judged to be more urgently needed for training purposes; the unit was disbanded on 6 January 1944 and its assets divided between No. 8 SFTS and No. 1 Operational Training Unit at RAAF Station East Sale, Victoria, as well as No. 71 Squadron. No. 71 Squadron was itself disbanded on 28 August 1944 at Coffs Harbour.

One of the flying school's graduates in August 1944 was David Evans, who went on to become Chief of the Air Staff. His passing-out parade was delayed by a month because, as Evans later discovered, the British government had peremptorily decided in April that it no longer required graduates from Australia, leaving the RAAF with a surplus of some 7,000 aircrew. With training at No. 8 SFTS winding down, in October 1944 a civil operator, Aircraft Pty Ltd, began using Bundaberg for its flights between Brisbane and Rockhampton. The following month, six of the school's Ansons were detached to the Australian Army, carrying out exercises with I Corps at Mareeba until March 1945. The last course to graduate at No. 8 SFTS did so on 13 December 1944; all pilots still under instruction were transferred to No. 6 Service Flying Training School at RAAF Station Mallala, South Australia, to finish their course. The school spent the next few months preparing the base to be handed over to elements of the Netherlands East Indies Air Force before disbanding on 25 July 1945.
