= SS Fingal (1923) =

Norwegian merchant ship

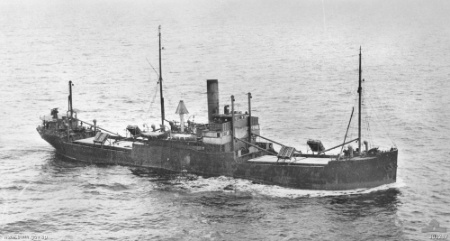
- SS Fingal in 1942

History
- Builder: Moss Værft
- Launched: 1923
- Completed: 17 March 1923
- Fate: Sunk 5 May 1943

General characteristics
- Tonnage: 2,137 GRT

SS Fingal was a Norwegian merchant ship of 2,137 tons which was sunk during World War II off the coast of Australia.

== Brief history ==
Fingal was built at Moss Værft, Norway 1923.

In December 1941, the steamer had been damaged by Japanese bombing when en route between Rangoon and Calcutta.

In May 1943, Fingal was under charter to the Australian Government. She was sailing from Sydney to Darwin shipping cargo and ammunition escorted by USS Patterson, crewed by 31 men, mainly Scandinavian, apart from six Australians including two Royal Australian Navy gunners.

At about 1:35pm off Nambucca Heads, New South Wales on 5 May 1943, two torpedoes fired from the Japanese submarine I-180 struck the side of her hull. Fingal sank within a minute and Patterson dropped depth charges and immediately left the area.

Survivors from the sinking ship clung to debris. A RAAF Avro Anson DG696 from No. 71 Squadron, crewed by Sergeant Geoffery Gillmore (pilot), Flying Officer Max Sharrad (Navigator) and Sergeant J "Poppa" Hall (WAG), operating out of Coffs Harbour was escorting her at the time, flying about 10 miles (16 km) ahead of the ship. DG696 saw two torpedoes converging on the ship and flew along the tracks but saw no sign of the submarine and made no attack. Another aircraft, DG 825, was despatched from Coffs Harbour on a Rescue and Search mission. Crew included P/O McKernan and F/L AB (Barrie) Blackstone (navigator). They located the survivors and advised Patterson which returned to pick up the survivors, who had spent four hours in the sea. 19 of the crew survived. Patterson dropped off the survivors at Newcastle at 9:00am on 6 May 1943.

Twelve men were killed in the sinking, including the captain, chief officer and all the engineers.
