= Fairyland, Lane Cove River =

Fairyland
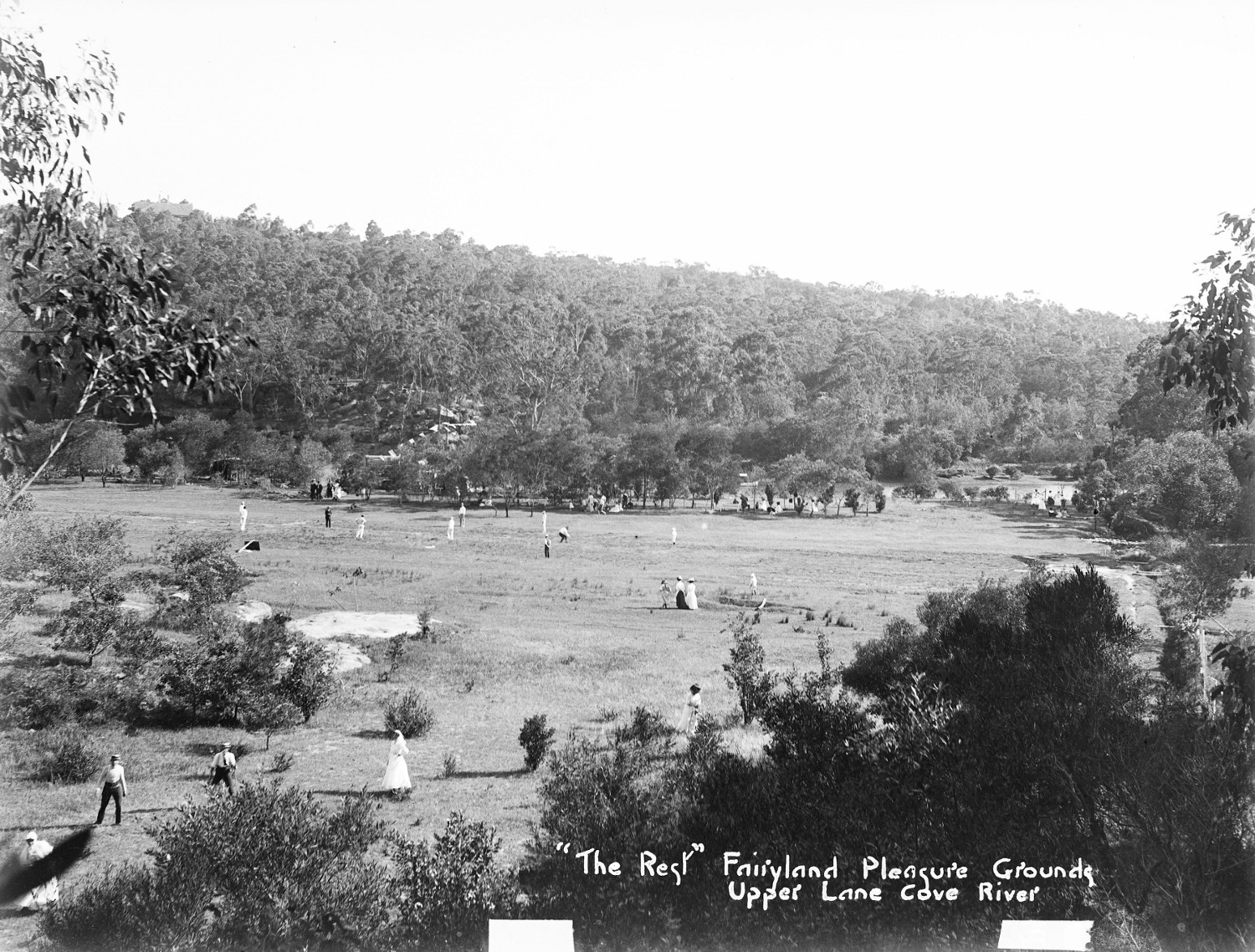
- "The Rest" at Fairyland

- Location within New South Wales
- 33.798351°S 151.149661°E
- Location: Lane Cove National Park, North Ryde, Sydney, New South Wales, Australia

History
- Formed: 1910

Site notes
- Elevation: 5

Fairyland Pleasure Ground was a former recreation and picnic area on the Lane Cove River, in Sydney, Australia.

== Pre European History ==
The local indigenous Australian people, the Cammeraygal occupied the area east of the river for at least 5,800 years. The Wallumettagal people were located west of the river. The original area was relatively flat and swampy. Vegetated mostly by eucalyptus, acacia, tea tree, bracken, swamp oak and paperbark.

== Swan Family and Fairyland ==
Illegal logging occurred at the Fairyland site as early as 1834. By 1847 at least ten people were listed as living in the area. In 1895, the state government sold blocks of land beside the river. Robert Joshua Campbell Swan (1864–1943) and other family members purchased Portions 385 and 386 of Field of Mars for £141. Around 1900, the natural forest country was cleared for agriculture by the Swan family. Many different crops were grown including strawberries and watermelons. New Zealand flax was grown to tie parcels of fruit. By 1905 the property had acquired a name, "The Rest". Between 1905 and 1910 the market gardens were phased out.

After noticing the success of the Avenue Pleasure Grounds downstream at the Fig Tree Bridge and the Fern Bay Pleasure Grounds at Drummoyne, the Swan family then changed the area for recreation.

They planted exotic plant species such as the camphor laurel and date palm. Placing painted fairytale figures on trees, and carved fairy like wooden figures were placed in the grounds, such as Little Bo Peep. There was a slippery-dip in the shape of a sleeping giant, supposedly based on the character "Brutus" from Popeye. Other features were the wooden pirate boat, tiny tots and the upside-down house. Fairyland soon became popular and successful. Fairyland offered a more enticing prospect than its two rivals, mainly due to a more remote and appealing location.

Access to the ground was mostly by ferry. A wharf was built on the river. Some boats would take up to 70 passengers at a time. Two of the craft regularly visiting Fairylands were the Escort and the Twilight. In 1918, when the Upper Lane Cove River Ferry Company closed, Fairyland acquired some of their ferries to be part of Fairyland's operations. Church groups, schools, companies and families used the area for picnics and recreation.

=== Equipment & Dance Hall ===
A kiosk, and much playground equipment was installed, such as a flying fox, swings and a wooden pirate ship. The "razzle-dazzle" was a popular circular ride, originating from White City Pleasure Grounds at Rushcutters Bay as was the flying fox and ticket boxes. The ride was said to emulate an ocean voyage, built in 1914. From White City, Robert Swan also acquired strength-testing machines and coin-operated machines through which customers could view silent films. Six boat swings came from Putney Park. A dance hall was built around 1930. Also around that time, netting was installed around a small sandy beach on the river for swimming.

Certain dancers were known to take a train to Chatswood, then walk downhill to the eastern side of the river, then call for boats to take them across the river to the dance hall. After the construction of Fullers Bridge, a road was built down from Delhi road. Parking was available for 120 cars. In wet weather, the parking area became soaked, with cars being bogged.

== Closure ==
In the mid 20th century, Fairyland lost much of its popular appeal. Particularly with the expanding suburbs of Sydney, the diminishing remoteness, the rise of the motor car and the opening of the Epping Road bridge. After a series of floods in 1967, 1968 and 1969 Fairyland closed. The area was purchased by the National Parks of New South Wales in the late 1970s. Little evidence of the park exists today, particularly after the severe fires of 1994. The access road off Delhi Road is currently closed, overgrown and barely recognisable. A pair of rusted gate holders and some asphalt are all that remain.

After the area was abandoned, invasive weeds have been particularly troublesome. Much work by bush regenerators has continued into the 21st century. Today, the 42 hectare area is home to three Endangered Ecological Communities. Notable wildlife so close to the city of Sydney here includes the Powerful Owl, Osprey and Echidna. Fairyland is on the Great North Walk.
