= No. 12 Elementary Flying Training School RAAF =

- Active: 1941–1942
- Country: Australia
- Branch: Royal Australian Air Force
- Role: Introductory flying training
- Engagements: World War II

Aircraft flown
- Trainer: Tiger Moth

No. 12 Elementary Flying Training School (No. 12 EFTS) was a Royal Australian Air Force (RAAF) pilot training unit of World War II. It was established in October 1941 at Bundaberg Airport and provided introductory flying training for new RAAF pilots. The school relocated to Lowood Airfield on 12 January 1942. Due to arrival of the United States Army Air Corp at Lowood in March, the aircraft, staff and trainees were allocated to other units, and No. 12 EFTS was disbanded in April.

== History ==
As part of Australia's commitment to the Empire Air Training Scheme, the RAAF established twelve elementary flying training schools in 1940 and 1941. The role of these units was to provide a twelve-week-long introductory flying training course to new pilots who had graduated from one of the RAAF's initial training schools. The flying training was undertaken in two stages; the first involved four weeks of instruction (including ten hours of flying) which were used to determine trainees' suitability to become pilots. Those that passed this grading process then received a further eight weeks of training (including 65 hours of flying) at the elementary training school. Pilots who successfully completed this course were posted to a service flying training school in either Australia or Canada for the next stage of their instruction as military aviators.

No. 12 Elementary Flying Training School (No. 12 EFTS) was established at Bundaberg Airport on 16 October 1940. This aerodrome pre-dated the war, and had been used as a civilian airport since 1931. No. 12 EFTS relocated to Lowood Aerodrome on 12 January 1942. Due to arrival of the United States Army Air Corp at Lowood in March, the aircraft, staff and trainees were allocated between No. 8 and No. 10 Elementary Flying Training Schools. The school was disbanded on 18 April 1942.
