= Narrandera Airport =

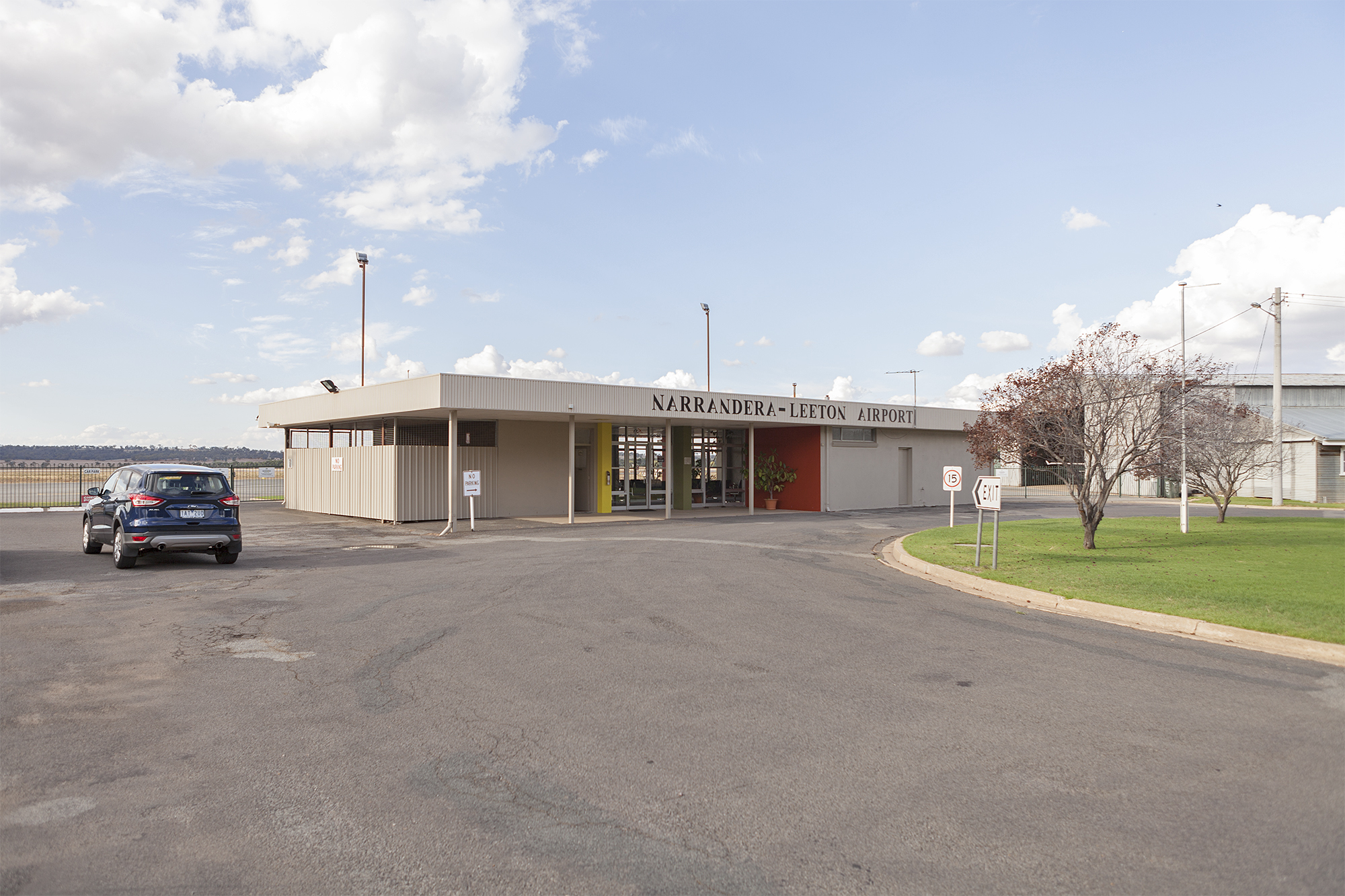
- Narrandera Airport terminal
- IATA: NRA; ICAO: YNAR

Summary
- Airport type: Public
- Owner: Narrandera Shire Council
- Location: Narrandera, New South Wales
- Elevation AMSL: 474 ft (144 m)
- Coordinates: 34°42′08″S 146°30′44″E
- Website: www.narrandera.nsw.gov.au

Map
- Location in New South Wales

Runways
Direction	Length		Surface
Direction	m	ft	Surface
05/23	1,020	3,346	Gravel
14/32	1,616	5,302	Asphalt
- Sources: Australian AIP and aerodrome chart

Narrandera Airport (also known as Narrandera-Leeton Airport) (IATA: NRA, ICAO: YNAR) is a small regional airport in the local government area of Narrandera in the Riverina region of New South Wales, Australia. The airport is located 4 nautical miles (7.4 km; 4.6 mi) northwest of Narrandera along Irrigation Way. The airport services the towns of Leeton and Narrandera as it is located between the two towns.

The airport received $109,000 in funds for security upgrades in 2006.

== RAAF Station Narrandera ==
The aerodrome was acquired in 1940 as a station for the Royal Australian Air Force's No. 8 Elementary Flying Training School, under the wartime Empire Air Training Scheme. The station closed after the end of hostilities in 1945.

On 3 September 1945, an RAAF Bristol Beaufighter assigned to No. 92 Squadron crashed into the canal at the western end of the town during a joy flight, killing all seven people on board.

== Airlines and destinations ==
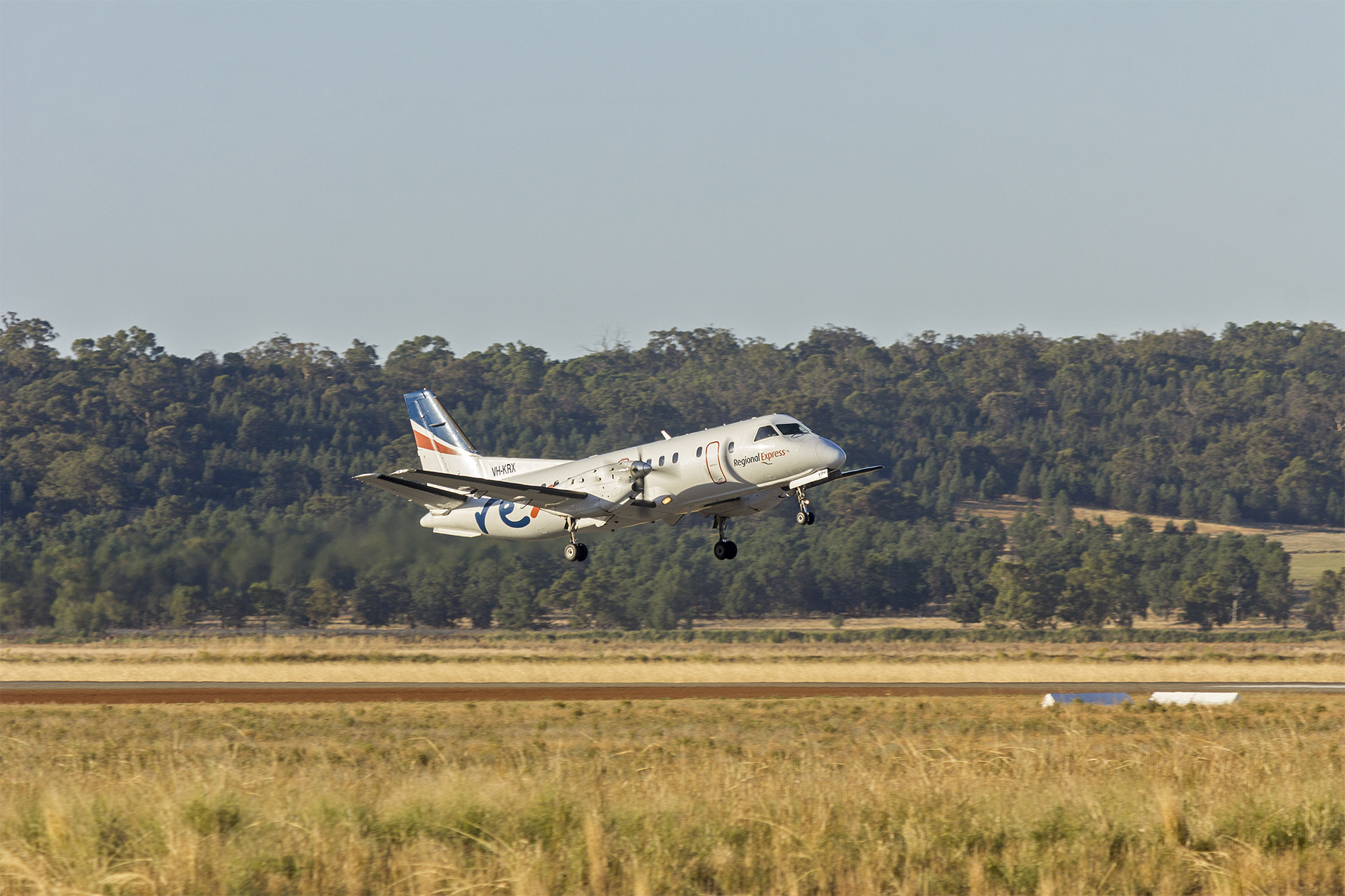
Rex Airlines Saab 340B taking off at Narrandera Airport

Airlines	Destinations
Rex Airlines	Griffith, Sydney

== See also ==
- List of airports in New South Wales
