= No. 71 Squadron RAAF =

Royal Australian Air Force squadron

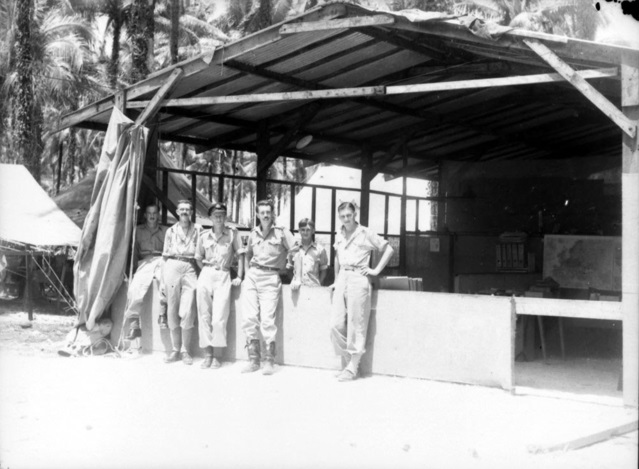
- No. 71 Squadron personnel at Los Negros, April 1944
- Active: 1943–1944
- Country: Australia
- Branch: Royal Australian Air Force
- Role: Maritime patrol
- Engagements: World War II

Insignia
- Squadron code: PP

Aircraft flown
- Patrol: Anson

No. 71 Squadron was a Royal Australian Air Force (RAAF) maritime patrol squadron of World War II. It was formed in January 1943 and conducted patrols off the east coast of Australia until it was disbanded in August 1944.

== History ==
During the first half of 1943 Japanese submarines operated off the Australian east coast, sinking 16 ships and damaging several more. In response to these losses the Australian Government expanded the military's anti-submarine warfare (ASW) forces. Three new RAAF maritime patrol units equipped with Avro Anson training aircraft, No. 66, No. 67 and No. 71 squadrons, were raised during this expansion. It was recognised that the Ansons lacked sufficient range and payload to be effective in the ASW role, but superior aircraft were not available.

No. 71 Squadron was formed on 26 January 1943 at RAAF Station Lowood, Queensland, from aircraft and aircrew drawn from No. 8 Service Flying Training School. The squadron was organised into flights located at RAAF Stations Amberley and Bundaberg in Queensland, and RAAF Stations Richmond and Coffs Harbour in New South Wales.

The squadron began flying anti-submarine and convoy escort patrols shortly after its formation. On 17 March a No. 71 Squadron aircraft attacked what its crew believed was a Japanese submarine. The same crew claimed to have been fired on by another submarine eleven days later. On 5 May a No. 71 Squadron Anson was patrolling over a convoy when the merchant ship SS Fingal was torpedoed and sunk. The aircraft's crew spotted the torpedo tracks, but were unable to locate the Japanese submarine. Ten days later one of the squadron's aircraft on a routine anti-submarine patrol spotted a lifeboat containing survivors from the AHS Centaur, which had been sunk by a Japanese submarine on 14 June; the loss of the ship was unknown at the time, and this was the first sighting of survivors. No. 71 Squadron took part in the subsequent intensive search for both further survivors and the submarine responsible, but only found empty life rafts. The squadron was involved in another attack on a convoy on 16 June, when one of its Ansons was patrolling ahead of Convoy GP55 at the time two ships were torpedoed by Japanese submarine I-174. The aircraft ran low on fuel shortly after the attack, and had to return to base without sighting the submarine. Two of the squadron's Ansons crashed during patrols in 1943, each with the loss of its entire crew.

In December 1943, No. 71 Squadron's headquarters moved to Coffs Harbour, the flight at Lowood following in June. In July 1944 it was decided to disband Nos. 71 and 73 Squadrons as part of a reduction in the RAAF's ASW effort. No. 71 Squadron was declared non-operational on 12 July 1944 but continued to fly training exercises until it was disbanded on 28 August.
