= Bradfield, New South Wales (1924–1977) =

Coordinates: 33.7755°S 151.1484°E

Bradfield, the western portion of which was also known as Bradfield Park, was a suburb on the North Shore of Sydney, Australia between 1924 and 1977, since absorbed by neighbouring Lindfield.

The name commemorates Dr John Job Crew Bradfield, who oversaw design and construction of the Sydney Harbour Bridge between 1913 and 1932.

== Bradfield subdivision ==
Bradfield or Bradfield Park
- Suburb
- Country: Australia
- State: New South Wales
- City: Sydney
- LGA: Ku-ring-gai
- Location: 11 km (6.8 mi) north-west of Sydney CBD
- Established: 1924-1977

Area
  - Total: 2.6 km^{2} (1.0 sq mi)
- Postcode: 2070

The North Shore suburbs north of Chatswood initially developed as a narrow ribbon straddling the North Shore railway line. These early subdivisions were fringed by orchards, vineyards and scrub. Following World War I, wider availability of private motor vehicles and new privately owned bus services made it possible to live further from the railway stations.

Construction commenced on the Sydney Harbour Bridge in 1923. The project meant that the Shore would at last have a direct road, rail and tramway connection to Sydney's central business district. Seizing the opportunity, in 1924 Ku-ring-gai Shire Deputy President Christopher Thistlethwayte proposed that his fellow councillors allow the Moore Estate, of which his family owned a share, to be subdivided for residential development. The Estate was made up of around 250 hectares on the western side of Lindfield, in the ridges and valleys leading down to an old racecourse and the Lane Cove River beyond.

To ensure that prospective buyers did not miss the link between the bridge's completion and the future value of the land, he proposed that it be named after the project's high-profile chief engineer, John Bradfield. The Council agreed to Thistlethwayte's plan: shire president John Lockley considered the engineer, who lived in nearby Gordon, to be "Ku-ring-gai's greatest citizen".

Bradfield's wife Edith officiated at the naming ceremony, held on 19 July 1924. One of the attendees, local MP and future premier Tom Bavin, predicted that "Dr Bradfield's name would be closely connected with the bridge itself and North Shore generally for all time."

A plan of the suburb was drawn up by a "prominent town-planner" and the first lots, along Provincial Road between Primula Street and Fiddens Wharf Road, were auctioned in 1927. The following year, the Sunday Times real estate section enthused:

Because of its mountain air, and its lovely forest areas, this region is becoming more and more popular with people who wish to make their homes handy to the city, and yet be able to get into a quiet and restful atmosphere once they late left shop, office, or factory. For the home-maker, there is no more desirable locality than this. It is about 300 feet [91 metres] above sea level, is situated in undulating country, possesses charming scenic surroundings, and most attractive sites for homes. It has been correctly described as a garden suburb. In this region people get the benefit of mountain air and escape the humidity of places nearer the sea.

The subdivision was promoted heavily on the basis of its proximity to Killara Golf Course and the future completion of the Bridge. But with the latter still years away, interest in the suburb was slow to build. In 1928, Highfield Road was extended west, and lots were offered on the new Bell Avenue, Bradfield Road, Dorman Crescent and Moore Avenue. Moore Avenue, which led south through the estate to Fullers Bridge, was planned to form part of a secondary route north parallel to what later became the Pacific Highway. This road, championed by local councils along the route but never completed, was known as "The Broadway". Access to the area improved further in 1933, when Moore Avenue/Broadway was extended north to De Burghs Bridge. It was renamed Lady Game Drive in honour of the Governor's wife Gwendolen.

The next area to develop was on the western fringe of the estate: what is now Carramar Road (until the 1960s known as Cooyong Road), Charles Street, Edmund Street, Johnson Street and Knox Street. In the centre of the suburb, the wedge-shaped area of open space between Bradfield Road and Lady Game Drive became known as 'Bradfield Park'. The site played host to the Australasian Jamboree of Boy Scouts in December 1938 to January 1939.

== Bradfield Park ==
Bradfield Park's life as a recreation reserve was brief. In 1939, the site was acquired by the Commonwealth Government and used to build a Royal Australian Air Force and Women's Auxiliary Australian Air Force training camp, RAAF Station Bradfield Park. The base became the largest air force instruction centre in the country, with capacity for 1,000 recruits.

=== Post-war housing crisis ===
The Great Depression and World War II had brought a halt to almost all residential construction in Australia. When the war ended, Sydney was estimated to be 'short' 90,000 houses. The NSW Government exacerbated the situation. Not only did it add to homelessness by undertaking slum clearance before replacement homes had been built; it crippled the private rental market by enforcing rent controls. This ensured no new rental properties would be built, while incentivising landlords to find ways to evict incumbent tenants.

Like its counterparts in other states, the recently established NSW Housing Commission sought to take over empty military camps for use as temporary accommodation. The Commonwealth agreed to lease only part of the Bradfield Park site to the Commission: its own Assisted Passage Migration Scheme meant that it was now responsible for housing thousands of immigrants from Europe. For the Commission, Bradfield Park was to become one of three so-called "Community Housing Centres" (the others were Herne Bay and Hargrave Park in Western Sydney) that together accommodated 12,500 people at any given time. The first homeless Sydney families arrived at Bradfield Park in 1947. Some had been relocated ahead of the razing of Waterloo; most had simply fallen on hard times.

Though they both faced a similar need to urgently provide temporary accommodation for thousands of people, and both operated from the Bradfield Park site, the Housing Commission and the Commonwealth Department of Labour and National Service had radically different approaches. The Commonwealth used a wide range of former defence structures, including nissen huts and tents, to accommodate its tenants. Meals were provided centrally in a mess hall; tenants shared amenity blocks. The Housing Commission wanted to provide each family with its own bathroom and kitchen, even in temporary accommodation, and so only used the "P1" huts – timber framed, rectangular buildings measuring 5.4 by 18.2 metres. Despite the enhanced privacy, the buildings were still very rudimentary: all were roofed with corrugated iron or asbestos cement; none had ceilings or internal lining. Tenants shared common laundries.

Conditions were squalid. Bradfield Park's internal roads were unpaved. Buildings built to temporarily accommodate airmen in 1939 were falling apart by 1955. Visiting the facility, MP Roger de Bryon-Faes described "breeding grounds for disease, unhappiness, social misfits and communism, in which human beings degenerate and become frustrated and bereft of all hope, initiative and ambition ... These hovels must be the most miserable place in Australia." By contrast, actor Bryan Brown, whose family lived at Bradfield Park for 12 months after moving from Britain, recalled the time fondly. "The great thing was there was a massive amount of bush around," he told a journalist in 2018. Hogan observes that Sydney was also home to shanty towns during this period, in which conditions were far dirtier and more dangerous – to have closed the Community Housing Centres would have been to force more people into makeshift dwellings.

From 1949 the Commission tenants were joined by the first wave of postwar European immigrants, roughly 450 people from Eastern Europe. In the early days, many of the immigrants were housed in a rows of tents stretching along Lady Game Drive. In 1951, the Commonwealth Department of Labour and National Service announced that the Eastern Europeans would be moved to hostels elsewhere in Sydney, to make way for 'Ten Pound Poms', participants in the Assisted Passage Migration Scheme. Around 200 refused to move and sought a court order allowing them to stay. When this failed, they left the site.

As the Housing Commission opened its vast new estates around Campbelltown, Mount Druitt, Redfern and Riverwood, pressure on the Community Housing Centres eased. The softening of rent controls from 1952 onwards assisted in reviving the private rental market. The last Commission tenants left Bradfield Park in 1964. With the population of the site falling, the Commonwealth subdivided the southernmost parts of the land. These became Boorabba and Guyong avenues and, beside the national park, the Presbyterian Church's new Naamaroo Conference Centre (now Uniting Venues).

The Commonwealth's migrant hostel continued operating until 1971. In its final years, the British immigrants were replaced with New Australians from South America.

=== Village centre ===
Bradfield faced the affluent suburb of Killara across Fiddens Wharf Road. School students from the two sides were strictly separated: migrant and low-income children went to Bradfield Park Public School, West Killara's kids went to Beaumont Road Public (opened 1953). Nevertheless, the two shared a little row of shops, built between 1950 and 1955 on the north side of Moore Street, just south of the boundary. This was a dual carriageway section of Lady Game Drive until about 1970, before through traffic was redirected one block to the north. The southbound carriageway nearest the shops was repurposed as a car park.

With Council support, the community funded construction of the Lady Game Community Centre at the end of Moore Street, also on the Bradfield side. The centre opened in 1961.

=== Disappearance of the name ===
The department bulldozed what remained of the migrant hostel in 1973. Part of the site was turned over to the Commonwealth Scientific and Industrial Research Organisation (CSIRO). CSIRO had determined that the site, relatively distant from major roads, enjoyed sufficiently low levels of vibration to house a new National Measurement Laboratory. The laboratory opened in 1978, and the remainder of the Commonwealth land was sold for private housing.

The presence of migrant and low-income families had, in the eyes of residents, affected perceptions of the area; despite Dr Bradfield's considerable achievements, his surname now carried a certain stigma. The West Lindfield-West Killara Progress Association waged a successful campaign for the name Bradfield to be dropped. (The Progress Association had itself been named Bradfield from its foundation in 1947 until 1949.) When the names and boundaries of Ku-ring-gai's suburbs were formalised in 1977, Bradfield was not among them. Hogan notes that Herne Bay and Hargrave Park were also erased from the map, disappearing into Riverwood and Warwick Farm. Indeed, very little documentary evidence of their existence remains in the State Archives.

The Commonwealth Government continued to refer to the area as Bradfield Park as late as 1979, however, thereafter reverting to "Lindfield". The local licensed post office, a newsagency in Moore Street, is known as Lindfield West.
