= No. 8 Elementary Flying Training School RAAF =

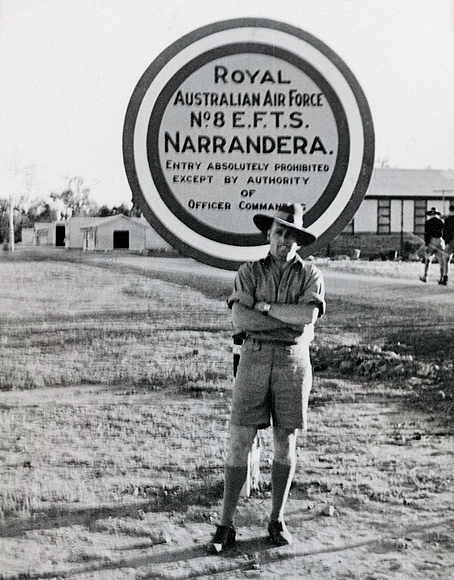
- Trainee at No. 8 Elementary Flying Training School, c. 1941
- Active: 1940–45
- Country: Australia
- Branch: Royal Australian Air Force
- Role: Introductory flying training
- Part of: Central Area Command (1940–41); No. 2 (Training) Group (1941–45)
- Garrison/HQ: Narrandera, New South Wales
- Service: World War II

Aircraft flown
- Trainer: Tiger Moth

No. 8 Elementary Flying Training School (No. 8 EFTS) was a Royal Australian Air Force (RAAF) pilot training unit that operated during World War II. It was one of twelve elementary flying training schools employed by the RAAF to provide introductory flight instruction to new pilots as part of Australia's contribution to the Empire Air Training Scheme. No. 8 EFTS was established in September 1940 at Narrandera, New South Wales. Training ceased in December 1944 and the school was reduced to maintaining base infrastructure and aircraft. It was officially disbanded in June 1945 and renamed Care and Maintenance Unit (CMU) Narrandera. The CMU was disbanded in December 1947.

== History ==
Flying instruction in the Royal Australian Air Force (RAAF) underwent major changes following the outbreak of World War II, in response to a vast increase in the number of aircrew volunteers and the commencement of Australia's participation in the Empire Air Training Scheme (EATS). The Air Force's pre-war pilot training facility, No. 1 Flying Training School at RAAF Station Point Cook, Victoria, was supplanted in 1940–41 by twelve elementary flying training schools (EFTS) and eight service flying training schools (SFTS). The EFTS provided a twelve-week introductory flying course to personnel who had graduated from one of the RAAF's initial training schools. Flying training was undertaken in two stages: the first involved four weeks of instruction (including ten hours of flying) to determine trainees' suitability to become pilots. Those that passed this grading process then received a further eight weeks of training (including sixty-five hours of flying) at the EFTS. Pilots who successfully completed this course were posted to an SFTS in either Australia or Canada for the next stage of their instruction as military aviators.

No. 8 Elementary Flying Training School was formed at Narrandera, New South Wales, on 19 September 1940, and came under the control of Central Area Command. The school occupied the site of the recently constructed civil airfield, as well as surrounding government land. Its inaugural commanding officer was Flying Officer G.F. Hughes. Despite primitive accommodation and lack of infrastructure at Narrandera, the first sixty students arrived at the school on the day of its establishment. Flying training did not get completely under way until mid-November. The school's strength as at month's end was 469 staff, including thirty-six officers. Recent newspaper reports had suggested that the Narrandera base would be closed owing to "unsuitable ground" and "the direction of the prevailing wind ... allied with the surrounding terrain". A cyclone hit the airfield on 6 December, destroying twenty-two de Havilland Tiger Moth trainers in a matter of minutes and damaging others. The RAAF resolved to replace the wrecked aircraft as soon as possible and, the next day, the Minister for Air denied the earlier reports that the base was unsuitable and would be closed.

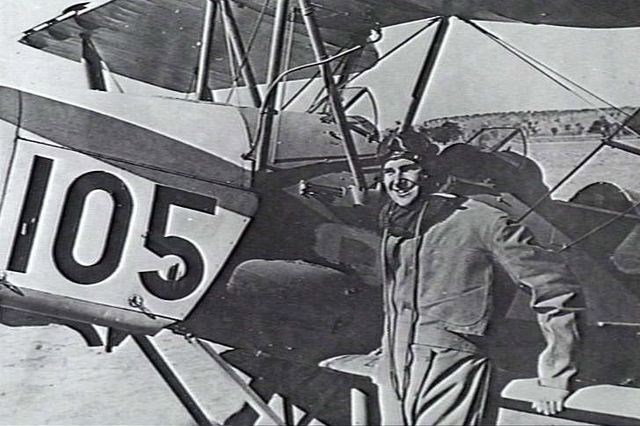
No. 8 EFTS pilot beside his training aircraft, May 1940

No. 8 EFTS's first course completed on 10 December 1940; fifty students graduated. As of the end of the month, the school had twenty-nine instructors, 111 students under training, and forty-one serviceable aircraft. An instructor was killed and three other men were injured when a Tiger Moth crashed while flying at low level over one of Narrandera's satellite airfields on 4 January 1941. Two of the school's Tiger Moths collided at 3,000 feet (910 m) on 8 March; the instructor and student of one plane bailed out, while the other two pilots crash-landed their aircraft, and there were no injuries. The school came under the control of the newly formed No. 2 (Training) Group in August, following the disbandment of Central Area Command. As of 31 December 1941, the school had twenty-eight instructors, 123 students under training, and thirty-seven serviceable aircraft. By 30 April 1942, the figures had risen to fifty-eight instructors, 211 students, and over seventy aircraft; strength remained at a similar level for the remainder of the year. On 8 September 1942, a No. 8 EFTS Tiger Moth dived to the ground soon after take-off from a satellite airfield and collided with a tender; one man in the tender was killed and several others, as well as both pilots, were injured. Four pilots were killed and two Tiger Moths destroyed following a mid-air collision at 600 feet (180 m) over another of Narrandera's satellite airfields on 9 March 1943. A pilot from the school was killed in a crash near Junee on 24 March. Another No. 8 EFTS pilot was killed and his crewman badly injured on 17 August after their Tiger Math failed to recover from a spin.

When flying training at No. 1 Elementary Flying Training School, Tamworth, ceased in September 1944, several of the pilots still undergoing instruction were posted to No. 8 EFTS. No. 8 EFTS received an Avro Anson the following month for use in ground instruction. Flying training was suspended in December 1944; the school was among several to be reduced to "nucleus" and continue to function primarily for the upkeep of base infrastructure and equipment under a reorganisation of EATS establishments in Australia. By this time No. 8 EFTS had eighty-three Tiger Moths on its strength. Owing to the surplus of trained aircrew in Australia, No. 8 EFTS was officially disbanded on 16 June 1945 and re-formed as Care and Maintenance Unit (CMU) Narrandera. CMU Narrandera was one of many such units that the RAAF raised for the storage and maintenance of surplus aircraft prior to their disposal after the war. It was disbanded on 5 July 1947.

The No. 8 EFTS Tiger Moth Memorial was dedicated at Narrandera by retired Air Chief Marshal Sir Neville McNamara on 2 October 1988.

== Commanding officers ==
No. 8 EFTS was commanded by the following officers:

From	Name
19 April 1940	Flying Officer C.F. Hughes
24 January 1942	Squadron Leader I.D. Gaze
3 April 1942	Wing Commander K. Ranger
6 December 1942	Squadron Leader G.A. Beaumont
4 April 1944	Wing Commander I.R.D. Masters
31 May 1944	Wing Commander E.A. Beaumont
23 November 1944	Wing Commander C.E. Martin
