= RAAF Station Mascot =

RAAF Station Mascot was a Royal Australian Air Force (RAAF) station which operated from Sydney's civilian aerodrome at Mascot, New South Wales, during the Second World War.

== History ==
No. 4 Elementary Flying Training School (4EFTS) operated from RAAF Station Mascot between 1940 and 1942. The EFTS gave recruits 50 hours of basic aviation instruction on a simple trainer such as a de Havilland Moth. Pilots who showed promise went on to advanced training at a Service Flying Training School. Others went on to different specialties, such as Wireless Schools, Air Observer Schools or Bombing and Gunnery Schools.

No. 2 Communication Unit and No. 3 Communication Unit were also located at the airfield during the conflict.

After 1946, the site was redeveloped to become Sydney Airport.
