= Tamworth Regional Airport =

Tamworth Airport Tamworth Regional Airport

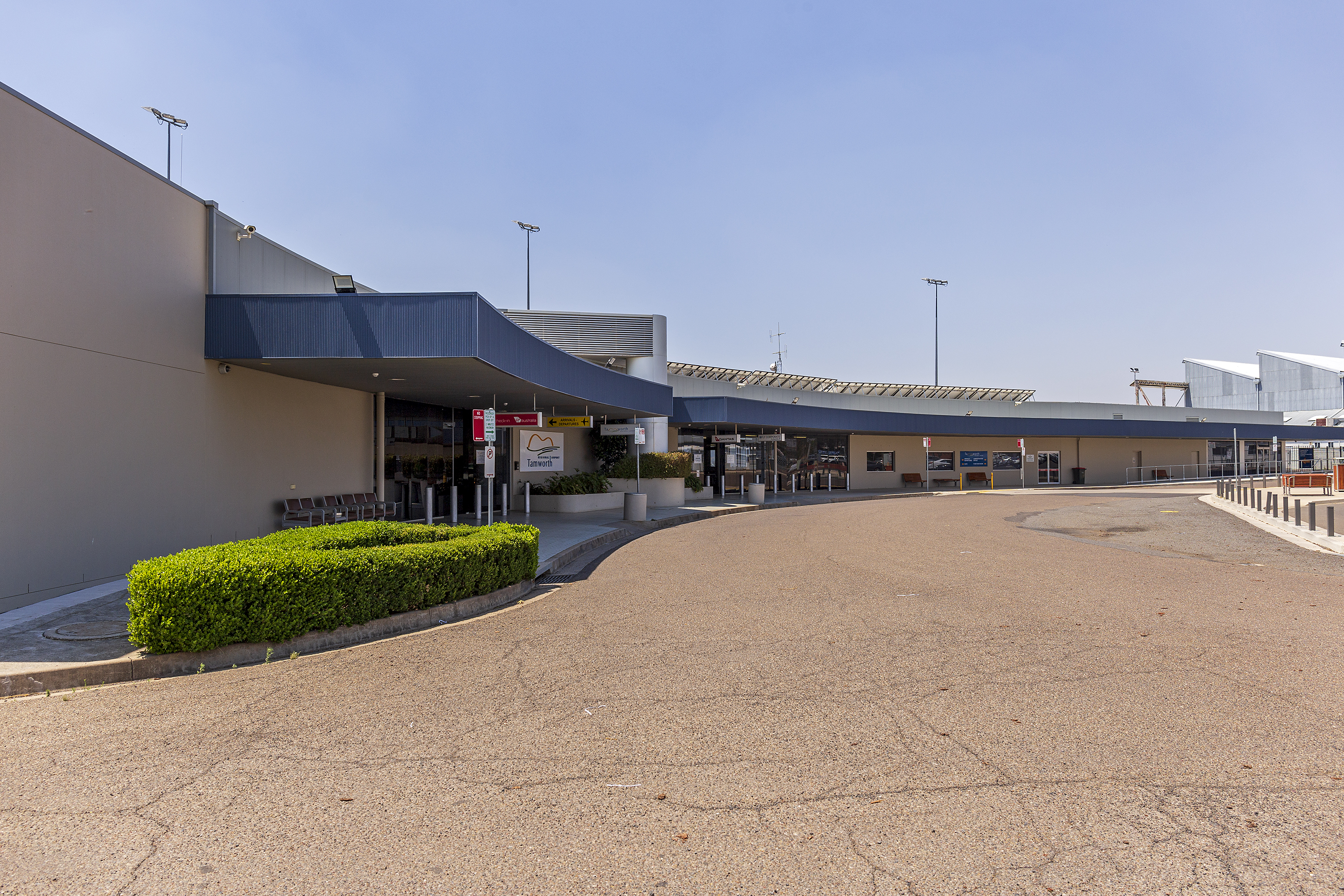
- Passenger terminal in October 2019
- IATA: TMW; ICAO: YSTW

Summary
- Airport type: Public
- Owner/Operator: Tamworth Regional Council
- Serves: Tamworth, New South Wales, Australia
- Elevation AMSL: 1,334 ft (407 m)
- Coordinates: 31°05′02″S 150°50′58″E

Map
- Location in New South Wales

Runways
| Direction | Length | | Surface |
| Direction | m | ft | Surface |
|---|---|---|---|
| 12L/30R | 2,200 | 7,218 | Asphalt |
| 12R/30L | 1,110 | 3,642 | Asphalt |
| 18/36 | 1,020 | 3,346 | Grass/clay |
| 06/24 | 842 | 2,762 | Grass/clay |

Statistics (2016–17)
- Revenue passengers: 189,628
- Aircraft movements: 77,426
- Sources: Australian AIP and aerodrome chart. Passengers (financial year) from Bureau of Infrastructure & Transport Research Economics. Aircraft movements (calendar year) from Airservices Australia.

Tamworth Airport (IATA: TMW, ICAO: YSTW) is a regional airport serving Tamworth, New South Wales, Australia. It is located 10 km (6.2 mi) from the town centre, on New Winton Road. The airport is owned and operated by the Tamworth Regional Council and is listed as being 5 nautical miles (9.3 km; 5.8 mi) west of the city. It is also known as Tamworth Regional Airport.

Tamworth Airport is the northern base of the Hunter Valley Westpac Life Saver Rescue Helicopter Service.

== History ==
No. 6 Elementary Flying Training School of the Royal Australian Air Force was formed in 1940, during World War II, at the original airfield (located in what is now the Taminda industrial area) as part of the Empire Air Training Scheme. Training included 50 hours of basic aviation instruction on a simple trainer like the Tiger Moth. Pilots who showed promise went on to advanced training at a Service Flying Training School. Others went on to different specialties, such as Wireless Schools, Air Observer Schools or Bombing and Gunnery Schools. The RAAF airfield went on to become the original home of East-West Airlines after World War II.

In 1951 a decision was taken to relocate the aerodrome with the council commencing construction in 1952 and the official opening of the new airport in 1956. In 1977 East-West Airlines opened a maintenance facility at the airport.

The airport received a further upgrade to medium jet standard in 1982. The addition of the 1,110 m (3,642 ft) parallel runway and associated facility expansion was undertaken between 1990 and 1993 as part of the establishment of a British Aerospace / Ansett pilot training joint venture which has evolved into the BAE Systems college.

East-West's maintenance facility closed in 1992 and was repurposed by fellow Ansett Transport Industries subsidiary Ansair as a bus bodying facility.

BAE Systems withdrew from Tamworth Airport in 2020 and the college facilities were re-branded as International Flight Training Tamworth (IFTT), under the ownership of Tamworth Regional Council, with CAE Oxford Aviation Academy Tamworth remaining on site.

The Tamworth Airport terminal expansion was completed in June 2012, to facilitate the commencement of passenger screening. A further expansion was carried out in 2014 to accommodate operations by additional carriers.

During the 2020 COVID-19 pandemic, the flight training school was converted into accommodation for the local boarding school Farrer Memorial Agricultural High School to comply with social distancing regulations.

== Facilities ==
The airport resides at an elevation of 1,334 ft (407 m) above mean sea level. It has two asphalt paved runways: 12L/30R measuring 2,200 m × 45 m (7,218 ft × 148 ft) and 12R/30L measuring 1,110 m × 18 m (3,642 ft × 59 ft). It also has two runways with a grassed brown clay surface: 18/36 measuring 1,020 m × 30 m (3,346 ft × 98 ft) and 06/24 measuring 842 m × 30 m (2,762 ft × 98 ft). The latest terminal upgrade was completed in 2019 with an enlarged departure lounge, new cafe and hire car facilities, relocated and enlarged Qantas lounge in addition to a multipurpose function room and airport administration office.

== Airlines and destinations ==
| Airlines | Destinations |
|---|---|
| Link Airways | Brisbane |
| QantasLink | Sydney |

In May 2015 Virgin Australia commenced operating services from Sydney to Tamworth. It ceased in September 2020.

== Statistics ==
Tamworth Airport was ranked 38th in Australia for the number of revenue passengers served in financial year 2022–2023.

Annual passenger and aircraft statistics for Tamworth
| Year | Revenue passengers | RPT movements |
|---|---|---|
| 2001–02 | 80,984 | 6,169 |
| 2002–03 | 68,029 | 4,859 |
| 2003–04 | 75,274 | 4,717 |
| 2004–05 | 86,503 | 5,040 |
| 2005–06 | 92,634 | 4,979 |
| 2006–07 | 98,199 | 3,510 |
| 2007–08 | 107,312 | 3,185 |
| 2008–09 | 116,669 | 2,911 |
| 2009–10 | 134,972 | 4,041 |
| 2010–11 | 153,680 | 4,566 |
| 2016–17 | 189,628 | 5,309 |
| 2017-18 | 191,853 | 5,243 |
| 2020-21 | 58,397 | 1,900 |
| 2022-23 | 153,638 | 3,988 |
