= RAAF Bradfield Park =

Australian air station

Coordinates: 33°46′40.92″S 151°8′55.99″E

RAAF Bradfield Park was a Royal Australian Air Force (RAAF) station located at the former suburb of Bradfield Park (now Lindfield), New South Wales during World War II.

== History of Bradfield Park ==
On 19 July 1924, the engineer Dr John Bradfield unveiled a sign-post "Bradfield" at the junction of Fiddens Wharf Road and Queens Road (Bradfield Road), West Lindfield. Ku-ring-gai Shire Council had earlier in 1924, decided to delineate 640 acres of land near the Lane Cove River for the new suburb. One of the councillors present stated:

"...that it would be fitting to call the new suburb Bradfield so that it numbers among its citizens the designer of the bridge and in this way its pride would be permanently recorded."

Bradfield Park was originally planned as a garden suburb, but from 1940 a station was built on the grounds, to house a number of RAAF and WAAAF units. During World War II, more than 200,000 members of the RAAF and the WAAAF received training on their way to service in World War II.

After World War II the base was utilised as a migrant hostel for new arrivals in Australia and for Australian families in urgent need of accommodation due to the acute housing shortage.

The site was later cleared and reclaimed for housing. A RAAF Memorial was officially opened to commemorate the former base on 29 October 2006.

== Units based at RAAF Bradfield Park ==
=== No. 2 Initial Training School ===
No. 2 Initial Training School was formed as part of the Empire Air Training Scheme. New recruits were posted to an Initial Training School to learn the basics of military life. They were taught subjects such as mathematics, navigation and aerodynamics.

=== No. 6 Initial Training School ===
No. 6 Initial Training School was also formed as part of the Empire Air Training Scheme.

=== No. 2 Women's Auxiliary Australian Air Force Training Depot ===
No. 2 WAAAF Training Depot was relocated to Bradfield Park as a lodger unit on 7 March 1942. It was disbanded on 18 February 1943 and its personnel incorporated into No. 5 WAAAF Training Depot.

=== No. 5 Women's Auxiliary Australian Air Force Training Depot ===
No. 5 WAAAF Training Depot was formed at Bradfield Park on 4 February 1943 to provide skilled and semi-skilled signals and maintenance personnel to fulfil RAAF commitments for local defence in Australia. The unit relocated to Penrith, New South Wales on 31 July 1944.

=== No. 2 Embarkation Depot ===
At the end of their courses of training aircrew and ground staff were posted to embarkation depots, where they were appropriately kitted and given final medical examination before going to operational theatres.

=== No. 3 RAAF Hospital ===
No. 3 RAAF Hospital was transferred from RAAF Base Richmond in 1941 and was a repatriation hospital for injured aircrew and ground staff.
