= Lane Cove National Park =

National park in Sydney, Australia

- IUCN category V (protected landscape/seascape)
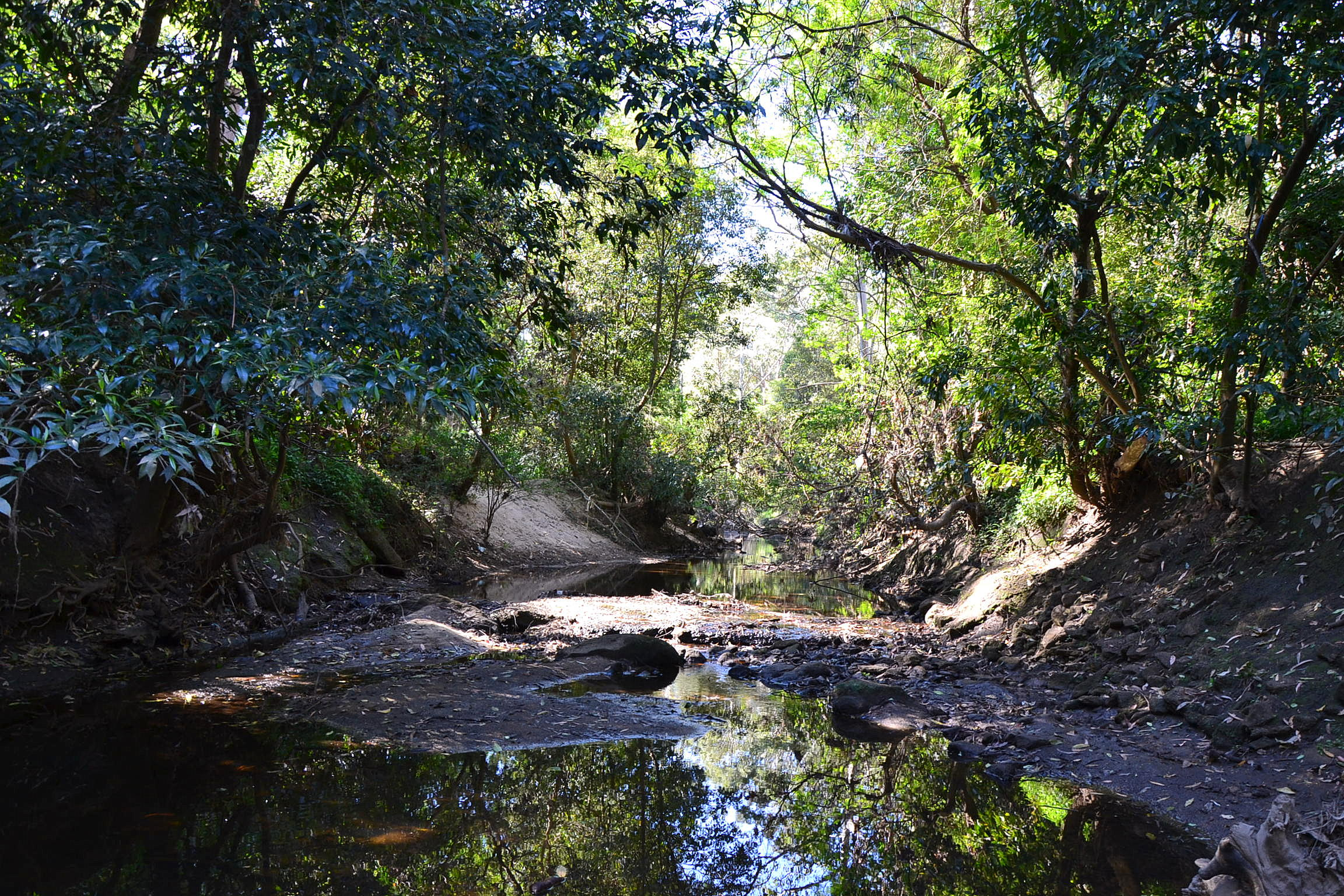
- Upper Lane Cove River
- Location: New South Wales
- Nearest city: Lane Cove
- Area: 6.7 km^{2} (2.6 sq mi)
- Established: 1938
- Governing body: NSW National Parks & Wildlife Service
- Website: Official website

The Lane Cove National Park is a protected national park that is located within metropolitan Sydney, in New South Wales, Australia. The 670-hectare (1,700-acre) national park is situated about 10 kilometres (6.2 mi) north-west of the Sydney central business district and features various vegetation types, such as, wet and dry sclerophyll forest, heathland, mangroves and tidal flats. The park consists of land near the banks of the Lane Cove River, which flows generally south-east into Sydney Harbour. It also extends to the outskirts of Pennant Hills and Wahroonga at its northern boundaries.

== Features and location ==
The park includes areas of land which are part of Ku-ring-gai, Ryde, and Hornsby local government areas with small areas of the park in Willoughby, Lane Cove and Hunter's Hill local government areas on the banks of the lower reaches of the river. The park is surrounded on all sides by developed suburban areas and except for the upper northwestern region is never more than a kilometre wide. Much of the park is of fairly rugged terrain on the slopes of the river valley and covered by dense bush. The characteristics of the bush vary depending upon soils and topography. Parts of the park are affected by weed infestations, such as Fiddens Wharf and Fairyland.

The central section of the park, between De Burghs Bridge on Ryde Road and Fullers Bridge, was set aside as a park in the 1920s and developed with picnic areas interspersed in the bush along the banks of the river. The majority of these picnic areas are located between the Fuller's Road bridge and the road that leads towards the Tourist Park. North of this point the area becomes more rugged and there are no picnic areas until the Tunks Hill (previously known as Tunks Farm) area which is away from the river behind the garden nursery on Lane Cove Road.

A weir was constructed in the 1930s near Fullers Bridge which converted the middle section of the river from tidal salt-water to a fresh-water area with constant water level suitable for recreational use in rowing boats and canoes. This area was managed by a trust and was called Lane Cove River Park. In 1982, the Government of New South Wales took over direct control of the park which was then called Lane Cove Regional Park. Various nearby areas of undeveloped government land near the river upstream and downstream from the central area including an area around Pennant Hills Park has also been added to the national park. It was then renamed Lane Cove National Park in 1992. See history for further information.

A fish ladder has been constructed next to the weir to enable Australian bass to access the freshwater breeding grounds upstream of the weir. Fishing is allowed in parts of the Lane Cove River as per restrictions managed by Department of Primary Industries.

The Lane Cove National Park is popular with walkers, joggers and cyclists. The Lane Cove River Tourist Park, operated by the NSW National Parks & Wildlife Service, is located within Lane Cove National Park.

Friends Of Lane Cove National ParkV was formed after the 1994 bushfires and runs volunteer bushcare groups through the park areas. The group also sources grants for bushland regeneration works.

The main walking track along the Lane Cove River forms part of the Great North Walk from Sydney CBD to Newcastle. This track incorporates a number of old tracks that were, in many cases, old logging trails.

== Flora ==
Common native plant species throughout the park include grass-trees, smooth-barked apples, old man banksias, flannel flowers, scribbly gums, and Wonga Wonga vines. See Friends of Lane Cove National Park list of what's flowering in the park.

== Fauna ==
The park is home to a variety of native bird species, including brushturkeys, kookaburras, superb fairywrens, crimson rosellas, sulphur-crested cockatoos, rainbow lorikeets, and eastern whipbirds. Non-native birds such as common mynas and red-whiskered bulbuls also occupy the park. Common reptiles include the eastern water dragon and lace monitors, whilst common mammals include swamp wallabies and echidnas.

== Urban issues affecting the Park ==
The park's position in the middle of a major metropolis necessitates compromises between the social desire for maintaining a pristine environment, and the need for urban development. Two examples of this compromise are:

1. The M2 Hills Motorway crosses the National Park at Epping and is clearly visible for kilometres to bushwalkers traveling along Terry's Creek.
2. In 2014 Sydney Water began rebuilding a 3.3 kilometre section of wastewater pipe located beside Terrys Creek, and running through bushland between Forrester Park, Eastwood and Browns Waterhole in the Lane Cove National Park, South Turramurra. This involved upgrading access tracks to the pipeline.

== See also ==
- Commandment Rock
- Devlins Creek
- Protected areas of New South Wales
- Friends of Lane Cove National Park
