= List of surviving de Havilland Mosquitos =

The de Havilland Mosquito is a British two-engine multi-role combat aircraft used by the Royal Air Force and other Allied air forces during World War II. Of the 7,781 aircraft built, 30 survive today, five of which are airworthy. Seven aircraft are currently under restoration as of March 2024.

== Surviving aircraft ==
=== Surviving aircraft by manufacturer ===
Plant	Number produced	Number surviving
de Havilland Hatfield	3,326	13
de Havilland Leavesden	1,476	4
Standard Motor Company	1,066	4
Percival Aircraft Company	245	0
Airspeed Aircraft	122	5
de Havilland Hawarden	96	0
de Havilland Canada	1,076	2
de Havilland Australia	212	3
	7,619	30

=== Surviving aircraft ===
Serial	Geographic location	Institution/owner	Status	History	Photo
W4050	(United Kingdom) London Colney, Hertfordshire	de Havilland Aircraft Museum	On display	Built by de Havilland Hatfield as prototype. First Mosquito built and had first flight on 25 November 1940. Owned by W. J. S. Baird of Hatfield from 1946 to 1959. Acquired by de Havilland Museum in 1959. The aircraft is now on display after its £41,000 restoration.	
A52-1053	(New Zealand) Auckland, North Island	Museum of Transport and Technology	On display	Built by de Havilland Australia with construction started as FB.40 A52-19. During production renumbered A52-1053 and converted to T.43. One of four Mosquitoes sold to RNZAF in April 1947; upon import renumbered NZ2305. Sent to 75 Squadron in April 1947. Sold to Robin Coleman in 1952. In 1964 purchased by MOTAT. Restoration completed in 2007.	
A52-1054	(New Zealand) Drury, North Island	Charles Somers and Rod Lewis	Airworthy	Built by de Havilland Australia with construction started as FB.40 A52-20. During production renumbered A52-1054 and converted to T.43. One of four Mosquitoes sold to RNZAF in April 1947; upon import renumbered NZ2308. Struck off in 1955 and left on a farm in Riwaka. Later salvaged by Glyn Powell who began to restore it. Following Powell's death in November 2019 it was acquired by Charles Somers and Rod Lewis. Restored at AVSPECS, New Zealand and made its first flight in 70 years on 18 March 2024.	
A52-319	(Australia) Canberra	Australian War Memorial	On display	Built by de Havilland Australia, with construction starting as FB.40 A52-210. During production, renumbered A52-319 and converted to PR.41. Sold in 1953 to James Woods. Changed hands several times between 1969 and 1971. In 1979 sold to Australian War Memorial.	
DZ542	(New Zealand) Ardmore, North Island	Avspecs	Under restoration to airworthiness	Built by de Havilland Hatfield as B.IV. Delivered in March 1944. Sent to 618 Squadron at RAF Skitten in April, to RAF Wick in July, and to RAF Beccles in August. Used to test Barnes Wallis's "Highball" bouncing bomb. Following the war sent to RAAF Narromine still on RAF charge. Struck off in 1947 and left on a farm. Acquired in 1988 by Glyn Powell. Project purchased later by Avspecs. Restoration half-complete, expected to be finished in late 2026. Currently for sale for USD 7.3 million.	
HJ711	(United Kingdom) East Kirkby, Lincolnshire	Lincolnshire Aviation Heritage Centre	On display, taxiable	Built by de Havilland Hatfield as NF.II. Sent to 169 Squadron at RAF Little Snoring. Flown in combat and credited with a Bf 110 over Berlin. In 1960s used by RAF Air Training Corps at Chingford. Acquired by Reflectaire Museum, Blackpool in 1971. Acquired by Tony Agar in 1972. Restored using parts from PF498, VA878, NT616, and RS715. Wears 169 livery as VI-C. In 2017 moved from Yorkshire Air Museum to Lincolnshire.	
HR621	(Australia) Harrington Park, New South Wales	Camden Museum of Aviation	Under restoration for display	Built by Standard Motors as FB.VI. Assigned to 618 Squadron. Following war sent to RAAF Narromine still on RAF charge. Sold in 1947 to M. Powell in Tomingley. Recovered in 1968 from a farm by Camden Museum of Aviation. Currently under restoration. (Museum is not open to the public.)	
KA114	(United States) Virginia Beach, Virginia	Military Aviation Museum	Airworthy	Built by de Havilland Canada as FB.26 and delivered to Royal Canadian Air Force on 22 February 1944. Struck off 13 April 1948. Sent to RCAF Vulcan and sold to a farmer in Milo, Alberta. Remains acquired by Canadian Museum of Flight in Vancouver in 1979. In 2004 purchased by Jerry Yagen of the Military Aviation Museum and sent to New Zealand for restoration by Avspecs. First flight on 27 September 2012. Arrived in the United States in March 2013.	
KB336	(Canada) Ottawa, Ontario	Canada Aviation and Space Museum	On display	Built by de Havilland Canada as B.XX. Taken on strength in June 1944 and assigned to No. 7 Operational Training Unit at RCAF Debert. Placed in storage in Calgary following the war. Sent to museum in Rockliffe in 1964.	
LR480	(South Africa) Johannesburg, Gauteng	South African National Museum of Military History	On display	Built by de Havilland Hatfield as PR.IX. Delivered to South African Air Force in 1944 and served operationally with 60 Squadron SAAF. Sent to South Africa for war publicity and later assigned to museum in 1946 where it has been ever since.	
NS631	(Australia) Point Cook, Victoria	RAAF Museum	Under restoration for display	Built by de Havilland Hatfield as PR.XVI. Sent to RAAF as A52-600 in December 1944 and served operationally with 87 Squadron RAAF. Stationed at RAAF Ballarat from 1947 to 1954. Sold to E. Voullaire of Mildura in 1954 and stored in an orchard. Acquired by Warbirds Aviation Museum in 1966. Owned by a group of three individuals from 1983 to 1987. Acquired by RAAF Museum in 1987. Currently under restoration.	
PZ474	(United States) Sacramento, California	Private (Charles Somers)	Airworthy	Built by de Havilland Hatfield as FB.VI. Delivered to RNZAF as NZ2384 in April 1947. Used privately from 1953 to 1959. Remains acquired by Rod Lewis circa 2017. Sent to New Zealand for restoration by Avspecs. First flight after restoration 13 January 2019 at Ardmore, New Zealand, piloted by Steve Hinton. Registered in New Zealand as ZK-BCV, the registration it wore between 1953 and 1955 after RNZAF service, then as N474PZ in the United States. Sold to Charles Somers mid-2020.	
RK952	(Belgium) Brussels	Musée Royal de l’Armée et d’Histoire Militaire	On display	Built by de Havilland Leavesden as NF.30. Acquired by Belgian Air Force in 1953 as MB24 and used until 1957, at which time it was placed in museum.	
RL249	(United Kingdom) East Goscote, Leicestershire	The People's Mosquito	Under restoration to airworthiness	Built by de Havilland Leavesden as NF.36. In February 1949 crashed at RAF Coltishall while with 23 Squadron. Wreckage recovered in 2010. Restoration underway in conjunction with Retrotec Ltd. Will be finished as an FB.VI.	
RS700	(Canada) Nanton, Alberta	The City of Calgary	Under restoration for display	Built by Airspeed Aircraft as B.35. Stored at RAF Silloth in early 1950s. Converted to PR.35 in 1951 and operated by 58 Squadron RAF. Used as an aerial photo mapping plane from 1954 to 1960 by Spartan Air Services of Ottawa, Ontario. Acquired in 1964 by Lynn Garrison of Calgary for the failed Air Museum of Canada. Now owned by the City of Calgary. Moved to the Bomber Command Museum of Canada in Nanton, AB and currently under restoration by the Calgary Mosquito Society to run and taxi status. Will be finished in Spartan livery. Viewable to public during restoration.	
RS709	(United States) Dayton, Ohio	National Museum of the United States Air Force	On display	Built by Airspeed Aircraft as B.35. Used in movies 633 Squadron in 1963 and Mosquito Squadron in 1968. Owned privately from 1964 to 1984. Acquired by USAF Museum in 1984 and displayed in USAAF livery as PR.XVI NS519.	
RS712	(United States) Oshkosh, Wisconsin	EAA Aviation Museum	On display	Built by Airspeed Aircraft as B.35. Used in movies 633 Squadron in 1963 and Mosquito Squadron in 1968. Owned privately from 1964 on. In 1981 acquired by Kermit Weeks. Has been on loan to EAA Museum since 1991.	
TA122	(United Kingdom) London Colney, Hertfordshire	de Havilland Aircraft Museum	On display	Built by de Havilland Hatfield as FB.VI. Stored at RAF Celle from 1950 to 1951, and at the Delft Technical University in the Netherlands from 1951 to 1964. Wings destroyed in 1958. Acquired by Royal Netherlands Air Force Museum in 1978. In 1978 acquired by de Havilland Museum. Restoration used wings from TW233, retrieved from Israel. Wears livery of 4 Squadron UP-G.	
TA634	(United Kingdom) London Colney, Hertfordshire	de Havilland Aircraft Museum	On display	Built by de Havilland Hatfield as B.35 and later converted to TT.35. Owned by City of Liverpool from 1963 to 1970. Used in movie Mosquito Squadron in 1968. Acquired by de Havilland Museum in 1970. Restored from 1980 to 1990. Wears livery of B.XVI ML963 (8K-K).	
TA639	(United Kingdom) Cosford, Shropshire	RAF Museum Cosford	On display	Built by de Havilland Hatfield as B.35. Used in movie 633 Squadron in 1963. Placed in RAF Museum storage in 1967. Put on display at Cosford in 1970. Wears livery of B.XX KB267 (AZ-E).	
TA661	(Canada) Windsor, Ontario	Canadian Historical Aircraft Association	Under restoration for display	Built by de Havilland Hatfield as B.35. Stored at RAF Silloth 1953-1954. Acquired by Spartan Air Services of Ottawa, Ontario in 1954. On 10 July 1956 made an emergency landing near Pelly Lake, Northwest Territories and was destroyed by fire. Wreckage recovered by Windsor group in 1996. Under restoration as KB161 by Windsor Mosquito Bomber Group.	
TA719	(United Kingdom) Duxford, Cambridgeshire	Imperial War Museum Duxford	On display	Built by de Havilland Hatfield as B.35. Used in movie 633 Squadron in 1963. Belly damaged during landing in 1964. Used in ground scene in Mosquito Squadron in 1968. Rebuilt from 1968 to 1973. Place on display at Duxford in 1978.	
TE758	(New Zealand) Christchurch, South Island	Ferrymead Aeronautical Society	Under restoration for display	Built by Standard Motors as FB.VI. Sent to RNZAF in April 1947 as NZ2328. Sold to private owner in 1955 and subsequently stored on a farm near Totara. Acquired in 1972 by Ferrymead Society. Under restoration using wings from HR339.	
TE881	(New Zealand) Ardmore, North Island	Biggin Hill Heritage Hangar	Under restoration to airworthiness	Built by Standard Motors as FB.VI. Sent to RNZAF and entered service in May 1947 as NZ2345. Sold to a private owner and subsequently stored near Mapua, west of Nelson. Under restoration by AVspecs in partnership with FlyaSpitfire.com, it is intended to be flown.	
TE910	(New Zealand) Blenheim, South Island	Private (Smith family) / Omaka Aviation Heritage Centre	On display, engines operational	Built by Standard Motors as FB.VI. Sent to RNZAF as NZ2336 in April 1947. Sold in 1956 to John Smith. Sat for 63 years in a shed on Smith's property. John Smith died in August 2019. In September 2020 the Mosquito along with several other planes were transferred to the Omaka Aviation Heritage Centre museum for restoration. On display since March 2021. Engines are operable and first ground runs were conducted in November 2021.	
TH998	(United States) Silver Hill, Maryland	National Air and Space Museum	Dismantled and in storage	Built by de Havilland Hatfield as B.35. Taken on strength in August 1945 at RAF Shawbury. Converted to TT.35 by Brooklands in 1952. Used as towing aircraft at RAF Exeter from 1952 to 1962. In August 1962 sent to United States for the Smithsonian. Has been in storage at Paul E. Garber Facility since then.	
TJ138	(United Kingdom) London	Royal Air Force Museum London	On display	Built by de Havilland Hatfield as B.35. Used as a travelling exhibit during the 1960s. Acquired by RAF Museum in 1967. On display at Hendon since 1992.	
TV959	(United States) Everett, Washington	Flying Heritage and Combat Armor Museum	Airworthy	Built by de Havilland Leavesden as T.III. Taken on strength in August 1945. Struck off in May 1963. In 1963 used in movie 633 Squadron. Acquired by Imperial War Museum in 1989. In 2003 FHCAM acquired the aircraft by trade and sent it to Avspecs in New Zealand for restoration. Made first flight in late 2016. Wears livery of FB.VI NS838.	
TW117	(Norway) Bodø, Nordland	Norwegian Aviation Museum	On display	Built by de Havilland Leavesden as T.III. Stored by RAF Museum from 1963 to 1967. In 1963 used in movie 633 Squadron. On display at Hendon from 1972 to 1991. Acquired by Norwegian Museum in 1991. Wears 333 Squadron livery as FB.VI.	
VP189	(Canada) Edmonton, Alberta	Alberta Aviation Museum	On display	Built by Airspeed Aircraft as B.35. Used by Spartan Air Services of Ottawa, Ontario from 1954 to 1963. Displayed at CFB Edmonton from 1968 to 1970. Purchased by City of Edmonton in 1975. Has been on display since 2002.	
VR796	(Canada) Kelowna, British Columbia	KF Aerospace Centre for Excellence	Airworthy	Built by Airspeed Aircraft as B.35. Stored until 1954. Used by Spartan Air Services of Ottawa, Ontario from 1954 to 1963. Owned by Don Campbell of Kapuskasing, Ontario from 1966 to 1986 and during that time restoration commenced. Moved to Mission, British Columbia in 1979. Owned by Ed Zalesky of Surrey, British Columbia from 1986 to 2002. Purchased by Robert Jens in 2000 and restoration completed in Victoria by Victoria Air Maintenance Ltd. First flight on 16 June 2014 by Steve Hinton. Wears livery of B.IX LR503 "F for Freddie," which crashed in Calgary during a celebration on VE Day (9 May 1945). Purchased by Barry Lapointe of KF Aero (Kelowna Flightcraft) in January 2022. Flown to Kelowna on June 30, 2022, it will be maintained in airworthy condition at the KF Centre for Excellence in Kelowna, B.C.	

== Wrecks ==
Serial	Geographic location	Institutional location	History
RF597	(New Zealand) Christchurch, South Island	Air Force Museum of New Zealand	Built by Standard Motors as FBVI. Sent to RNZAF as NZ2383. Owned privately from 1952 to 1957, at which time it was broken up. Acquired by RNZAF Museum in 1995. Sitting as a derelict hulk.
TE863	(New Zealand) Christchurch, South Island	Air Force Museum of New Zealand	Built by Standard Motors as FBVI. Sent to RNZAF as NZ2355 in July 1947. Disposed of at RNZAF Woodbourne in 1955. Owned privately after 1955. Acquired in 1988 by RNZAF Museum. Sitting as a derelict hulk.
TJ118	(United Kingdom) London Colney, Hertfordshire	de Havilland Aircraft Museum	Built by de Havilland Hatfield as B35. Placed immediately in storage with No 27 Maintenance Unit at RAF Shawbury. Converted to TT35 in 1953 by Brooklands Aviation. The nose was removed in 1963 and used for interior scenes in 633 Squadron. Later purchased by de Havilland Museum.
