= No. 2 Elementary Flying Training School RAAF =

Coordinates: 27.5713°S 153.0100°E

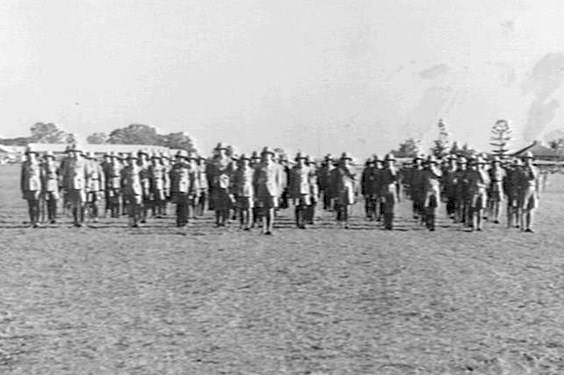
- Parade at No. 2 Elementary Flying Training School, Archerfield, mid-1940
- Active: 1939–1942
- Country: Australia
- Branch: Royal Australian Air Force
- Role: Introductory flying training
- Part of: Central Area Command (1940–41); Northern Area Command (1941–42)
- Garrison/HQ: Archerfield, Queensland
- Engagements: World War II

Commanders
- Notable commanders: Roy Phillipps (1940–41)

Aircraft flown
- Trainer: Tiger Moth; Gipsy Moth

No. 2 Elementary Flying Training School (No. 2 EFTS) was a Royal Australian Air Force (RAAF) pilot training unit that operated during World War II. It was one of twelve elementary flying training schools employed by the RAAF to provide introductory flight instruction to new pilots as part of Australia's contribution to the Empire Air Training Scheme. No. 2 EFTS was established in November 1939 as No. 3 Flying Training School at Archerfield, Queensland, and partially utilised aircraft and facilities of the civilian air training organisations based there. The school was renamed No. 2 EFTS in January 1940. It was disbanded in March 1942, and its operations transferred to No. 5 Elementary Flying School at Narromine, New South Wales, and No. 11 Elementary Flying School at Benalla, Victoria.

== History ==
Flying instruction in the Royal Australian Air Force (RAAF) underwent major changes following the outbreak of World War II, in response to a vast increase in the number of aircrew volunteers and the commencement of Australia's participation in the Empire Air Training Scheme (EATS). The Air Force's pre-war pilot training facility, No. 1 Flying Training School at RAAF Station Point Cook, Victoria, was supplanted in 1940–41 by twelve elementary flying training schools (EFTS) and eight service flying training schools (SFTS). The EFTS provided a twelve-week introductory flying course to personnel who had graduated from one of the RAAF's initial training schools. Flying training was undertaken in two stages: the first involved four weeks of instruction (including ten hours of flying) to determine trainees' suitability to become pilots. Those that passed this grading process then received a further eight weeks of training (including sixty-five hours of flying) at the EFTS. Pilots who successfully completed this course were posted to an SFTS in either Australia or Canada for the next stage of their instruction as military aviators.

No. 2 Elementary Flying Training School was formed as No. 3 Flying Training School at Archerfield, Queensland (), on 6 November 1939. Its inaugural commanding officer was Flight Lieutenant T.C. Curnow. Archerfield was home to private aviation clubs and schools including the Queensland Aero Club and Airwork Ltd, and it was the airfield's position as the hub of civilian flight instruction in the state that led to it becoming the base for the second flying school the RAAF raised during World War II. The same principle was followed in establishing No. 2 Flying Training School (later renamed No. 1 Elementary Flying Training School) at Parafield, South Australia, No. 3 Elementary Flying Training School at Essendon, Victoria, and No. 4 Elementary Flying Training School at Mascot, New South Wales.

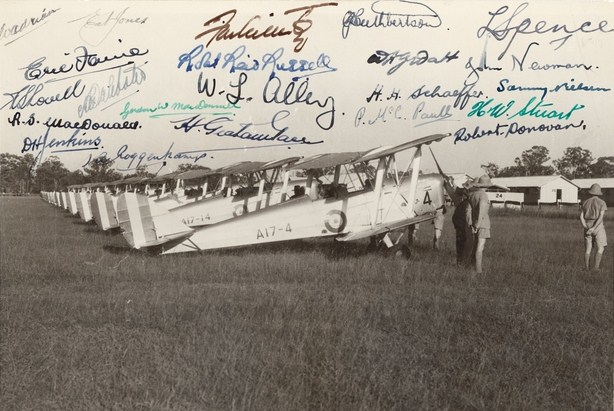
De Havilland Tiger Moth trainers at No. 2 EFTS (Archerfield) during an inspection by Lord Gowrie, Governor General of Australia, in March 1940. The photograph was signed by the recruits training at school at the time of Lord Gowrie's visit.

No. 3 Flying Training School was renamed No. 2 Elementary Flying Training School on 2 January 1940. Its first fifteen de Havilland Tiger Moth training aircraft were delivered three days later. These were augmented by privately owned Tiger Moths and Gipsy Moths pressed into military service. The first training course, lasting eight weeks, began on 10 January; twenty-one students graduated. By the end of the month, the school's strength included 105 officers and men, one civilian instructor, and twenty-six students. The unit log book reported the lack of a telephone system, kitchen facilities, beds, desks, hot water, blackboards, typewriters, flags, maps, charts, and "clothing other than stockings". A second civilian instructor, from the Queensland Aero Club, joined the school on 12 February 1940. Later that month, No. 2 EFTS was assigned to the control of the proposed Northern Area Command, which was eventually formed in May 1941. In the interim, all units in Queensland came under the control of Central Area Command, headquartered in Sydney.

The school's inaugural EATS course consisted of thirty-one students, who arrived at Archerfield on 29 April 1940; twenty-four of the students graduated. The second EATS course commenced on 27 June; eighteen of the twenty-four students graduated. As of 15 July, responsibility for all aircraft maintenance at the school was assigned to the Queensland Aero Club. Squadron Leader Roy Phillipps, a fighter ace with the Australian Flying Corps in World War I, assumed command of No. 2 EFTS on 20 October 1940. Phillipps died on 21 May 1941, when a private plane in which he was a passenger crashed after taking off from Archerfield. Operations at No. 2 EFTS were increased twofold in August 1941; by 30 September its strength included 202 officers and men, 1 civilian, and 91 trainees. Cross-country exercises could take students as far as Dalby and Coolangatta. Training accidents at the school were frequent, particularly from heavy landings, but did not result in any fatalities.

EATS training was put on hold in January 1942, following the outbreak of war in the Pacific, but resumed the next month. Owing to urgent requirements to house other RAAF units and elements of the United States Army Forces in Australia (USAFIA), No. 2 EFTS was disbanded on 31 March 1942, and its operations transferred to No. 5 Elementary Flying School at Narromine, New South Wales, and No. 11 Elementary Flying School at Benalla, Victoria. By the time it closed, No. 2 EFTS had trained 806 EATS students, 610 of whom had gone on to SFTSs.
