= No. 3 Elementary Flying Training School RAAF =

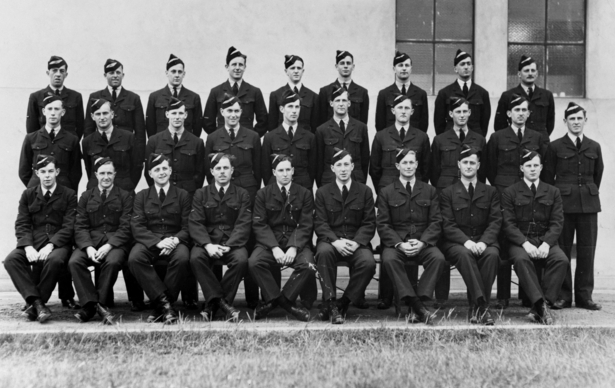
- RAAF officers attending No. 3 Elementary Flying Training School at Essendon, Victoria, 1941
- Active: 1940–42
- Country: Australia
- Branch: Royal Australian Air Force
- Role: Introductory flying training
- Part of: Southern Area Command
- Garrison/HQ: Essendon, Victoria
- Engagements: World War II

Commanders
- Notable commanders: Roy King (1940)

Aircraft flown
- Trainer: Tiger Moth; Gipsy Moth; Wackett Trainer

No. 3 Elementary Flying Training School (No. 3 EFTS) was a Royal Australian Air Force (RAAF) pilot training unit that operated during World War II. It was one of twelve elementary flying training schools employed by the RAAF to provide introductory flight instruction to new pilots as part of Australia's contribution to the Empire Air Training Scheme. No. 3 EFTS was established in January 1940 at Essendon, Victoria, and initially included a significant proportion of civilian staff and private aircraft; by mid-year these had been largely integrated into the military. The school was disbanded in May 1942, its aircraft and instructional staff having been transferred to No. 11 Elementary Flying School at Benalla.

== History ==
Flying instruction in the Royal Australian Air Force (RAAF) underwent major changes following the outbreak of World War II, in response to a vast increase in the number of aircrew volunteers and the commencement of Australia's participation in the Empire Air Training Scheme (EATS). The Air Force's pre-war pilot training facility, No. 1 Flying Training School at RAAF Station Point Cook, Victoria, was supplanted in 1940–41 by twelve elementary flying training schools (EFTS) and eight service flying training schools (SFTS). The EFTS provided a twelve-week introductory flying course to personnel who had graduated from one of the RAAF's initial training schools. Flying training was undertaken in two stages: the first involved four weeks of instruction (including ten hours of flying), which were used to determine trainees' suitability to become pilots. Those that passed this grading process then received a further eight weeks of training (including 65 hours of flying) at the EFTS. Pilots who successfully completed this course were posted to an SFTS in either Australia or Canada for the next stage of their instruction as military aviators.

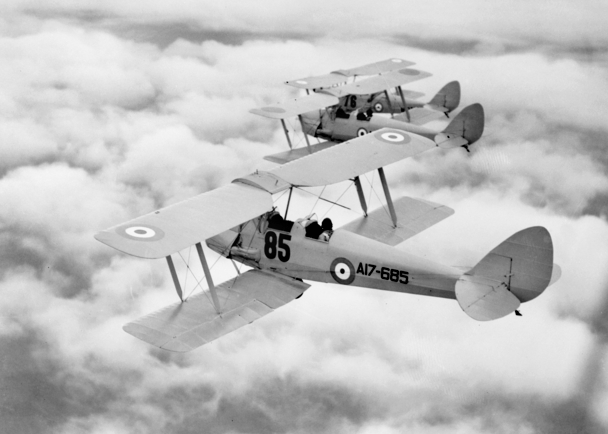
Tiger Moths of No. 3 EFTS, April 1941

No. 3 Elementary Flying Training School (No. 3 EFTS) was formed at Essendon, Victoria, on 2 January 1940, and came under the control of Southern Area Command. Its inaugural commanding officer was Squadron Leader Roy King, a fighter ace credited with 26 victories in the Australian Flying Corps during World War I. Essendon aerodrome had been established in 1921, and was home to several private aviation clubs and schools including the Royal Victorian Aero Club, ANA Flying School, and Victoria & Interstate Airways Ltd. It was the airfield's position as the hub of civilian flight instruction in Victoria that led to it becoming the base for the third flying school the RAAF raised during World War II. The same principle was followed in establishing No. 1 EFTS at Parafield, South Australia, No. 2 EFTS at Archerfield, Queensland, and No. 4 EFTS at Mascot, New South Wales.

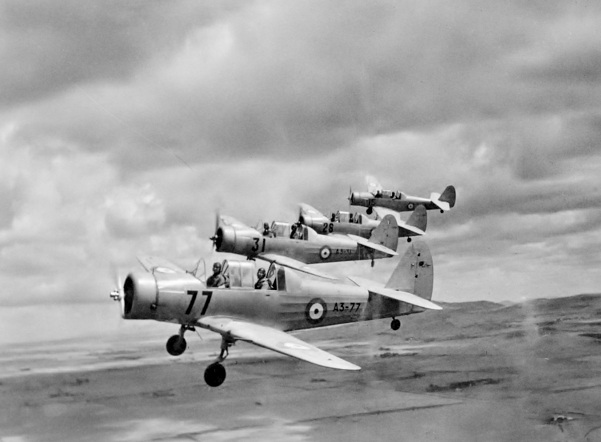
Wackett Trainers of No. 3 EFTS, February 1942

The first training courses at No. 3 EFTS were not conducted by RAAF instructors under the auspices of EATS but by Essendon's civil organisations under government contract. The training aircraft were privately owned de Havilland Tiger Moths and Gipsy Moths. All air cadets were subject to RAAF discipline, and the school's training program was directed by Squadron Leader King. The initial intake of sixteen students arrived on 8 January 1940, and received eight weeks of instruction that finished on 4 March; all but one of the trainees had prior flying experience, and the course was accident-free. The next student intake at No. 3 EFTS arrived on 5 February 1940. The school's inaugural EATS course commenced in May. Overall student numbers at this time were reported as being 48, while staff totalled 50. The second EATS course began in July. By this time, Essendon's civilian presence had effectively been absorbed by the military organisation; privately owned aircraft were taken over by the RAAF, which had also begun employing its own aircraft, the first being a Gipsy Moth that arrived in March. Training accidents were frequent, particularly during landings, but did not result in any fatalities.

Clyde Fenton, known for his exploits as a flying doctor in the Northern Territory before being commissioned as a pilot in the RAAF, served as an instructor at No. 3 EFTS from mid-1940 to early 1942. King was posted to command No. 5 EFTS at Narromine, New South Wales, in December 1940. By this time No. 3 EFTS was reported as having graduated 200 pilots in the eight flying training courses it had run since its formation. One of its graduates was Nicky Barr, who become a fighter ace in the North African Campaign with twelve victories to his credit. No. 3 EFTS began operating a ground-based Link Trainer on 17 February 1941. The school started flying the recently introduced CAC Wackett Trainer in August 1941, but the type proved troublesome, delaying the training program. From September to November 1941, a detachment of personnel from No. 11 EFTS also utilised training facilities at Essendon, after their home aerodrome at Benalla had been inundated by heavy rain. No. 3 EFTS's instructors, students and Wackett Trainers were transferred to No. 11 EFTS during April 1942, and the Essendon school was disbanded on 1 May.
