= Skitten Broch =

- Kilmster broch
- Location within Highland
- 58°29′31″N 3°09′44″W
- Type: Broch
- Periods: Iron Age
- Location: Scottish Highlands

Skitten Broch was an Iron Age stone structure, a broch between the villages of Killimster and North Killimster in Caithness, Scotland (grid reference ND32345655).

== Location ==
The RAF Skitten base was built on the remains of Skitten Broch.

== Description ==
Skitten broch was destroyed in the 1940s during the building of the nearby Killimster aerodrome, from which Operation Freshman departed.

== History ==
Sir Francis Tress Barry partially excavated Skitten broch in 1904. Ahead of its destruction in 1940, a second excavation was carried out by Charles S. T. Calder in 1940.
