= Elwyn Roy King =

Australian fighter pilot

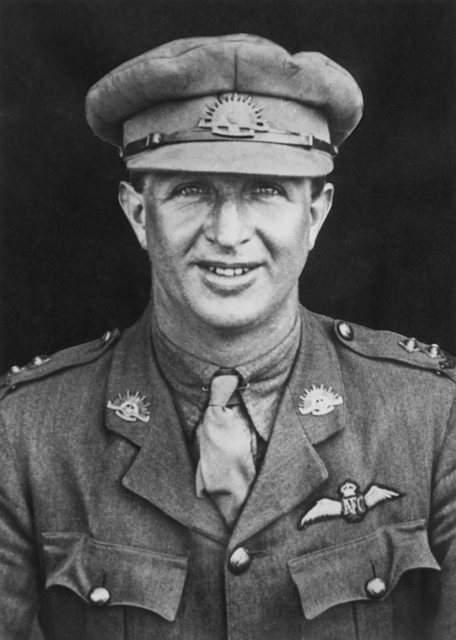
- Elwyn Roy King, c. 1917–18
- Born: 13 May 1894; Bathurst, New South Wales
- Died: 28 November 1941 (aged 47); Point Cook, Victoria
- Military career
- Allegiance: Australia
- Branch: Australian Imperial Force; Australian Flying Corps; Royal Australian Air Force
- Service years: 1915–19; 1939–41
- Rank: Group Captain
- Nicknames: "Bo", "Beau", "Bow"
- Unit: No. 4 Squadron AFC (1917–19)
- Commands: No. 3 EFTS (1940); No. 5 EFTS (1940–41); No. 1 SFTS (1941); RAAF Station Point Cook (1941)
- Conflicts: World War I; Western Front; German spring offensive; Hundred Days Offensive; World War II
- Awards: Distinguished Service Order; Distinguished Flying Cross; Mentioned in Despatches
- Other work: Businessman

Elwyn Roy King, DSO, DFC (13 May 1894 – 28 November 1941) was a fighter ace in the Australian Flying Corps (AFC) during World War I. He achieved twenty-six victories in aerial combat, making him the fourth highest-scoring Australian pilot of the war, and second only to Harry Cobby in the AFC. A civil pilot and engineer between the wars, he served in the Royal Australian Air Force (RAAF) from 1939 until his death.

Born in Bathurst, New South Wales, King initially saw service as a lighthorseman in Egypt in 1916. He transferred to the AFC as a mechanic in January 1917, and was subsequently commissioned as a pilot. Posted to No. 4 Squadron, he saw action on the Western Front flying Sopwith Camels and Snipes. He scored seven of his "kills" in the latter type, more than any other pilot. His exploits earned him the Distinguished Flying Cross, the Distinguished Service Order, and a mention in despatches. Returning to Australia in 1919, King spent some years in civil aviation before co-founding a successful engineering business. He joined the RAAF following the outbreak of World War II and held several training commands, rising to the rank of group captain shortly before his sudden death in November 1941 aged forty-seven.

== Early life ==
Roy King was born on 13 May 1894 at The Grove, near Bathurst, New South Wales. He was the son of English-born Elizabeth Mary (Miller) King and Richard King, an Australian labourer. The youth attended public school, and further educated himself in mechanical engineering via correspondence. Having been employed repairing bicycles, automobiles, and farming equipment, he was living in Forbes and working as a motor mechanic when he joined the Australian Imperial Force under the name Roy King on 20 July 1915.

== World War I ==
=== Early service ===
On 5 October 1915, King embarked for Egypt aboard HMAT Themistocles, as part of the reinforcements for the 12th Regiment of the 4th Light Horse Brigade. He joined the 12th Light Horse at Heliopolis in February 1916, as the unit was reassembling following its service in the Gallipoli Campaign. The regiment was engaged in the defence of the Suez Canal during May, and subsequently undertook patrols and sorties in the Sinai Desert.

King transferred to the Australian Flying Corps (AFC) on 13 January 1917, and was posted to Britain to join No. 4 Squadron AFC (also referred to as No. 71 (Australian) Squadron, Royal Flying Corps, by the British) as an air mechanic on 18 April. He was assigned to a training squadron for flying instruction in August. On 15 October, he gained his wings and officer's commission. Allocated to No. 4 Squadron in November 1917, King was posted to France for active duty on 21 March 1918. The same day, the Germans launched Operation Michael, the opening phase of the Spring Offensive.

=== Fighter ace ===
No. 4 Squadron was operating its Sopwith Camels in hazardous, low-altitude support of Australian ground troops when King arrived in France, and he had little opportunity for air-to-air combat. The burly 6-foot-5-inch (196 cm) King—nicknamed "Bo", "Beau", or "Bow"—also had problems landing the Camel; crammed into its small cockpit, his large frame impeded control stick movement. The resulting rough landings annoyed his commanding officer, Major Wilfred McCloughry, brother of ace Edgar McCloughry. King's friend and fellow No. 4 Squadron pilot, Harry Cobby, recalled that "there was some speculation that he might go home—but he proved himself an impressive pilot". Cobby often took King on "special missions" to make mischief with the Germans; No. 4 Squadron found that two-man patrols were generally able to lure enemy aircraft into a fight, whereas larger formations tended to deter engagements. On 14 May 1918, King shot down a two-seat German scout that was spotting for artillery between Ypres and Bailleul, but clouds prevented him from confirming its destruction. By 20 May, he had been credited with his first aerial victory, over a Pfalz D.III near Kemmel–Neuve Église. He was promoted to lieutenant on 1 June. On 20 June, he destroyed a German balloon over Estaires; although vulnerable to attack with incendiary bullets, these large observation platforms were generally well protected by fighters and anti-aircraft defences, and were thus considered a dangerous but valuable target. Later that month he shot down two more aircraft, a Pfalz and a two-seat LVG, in the Lys region.

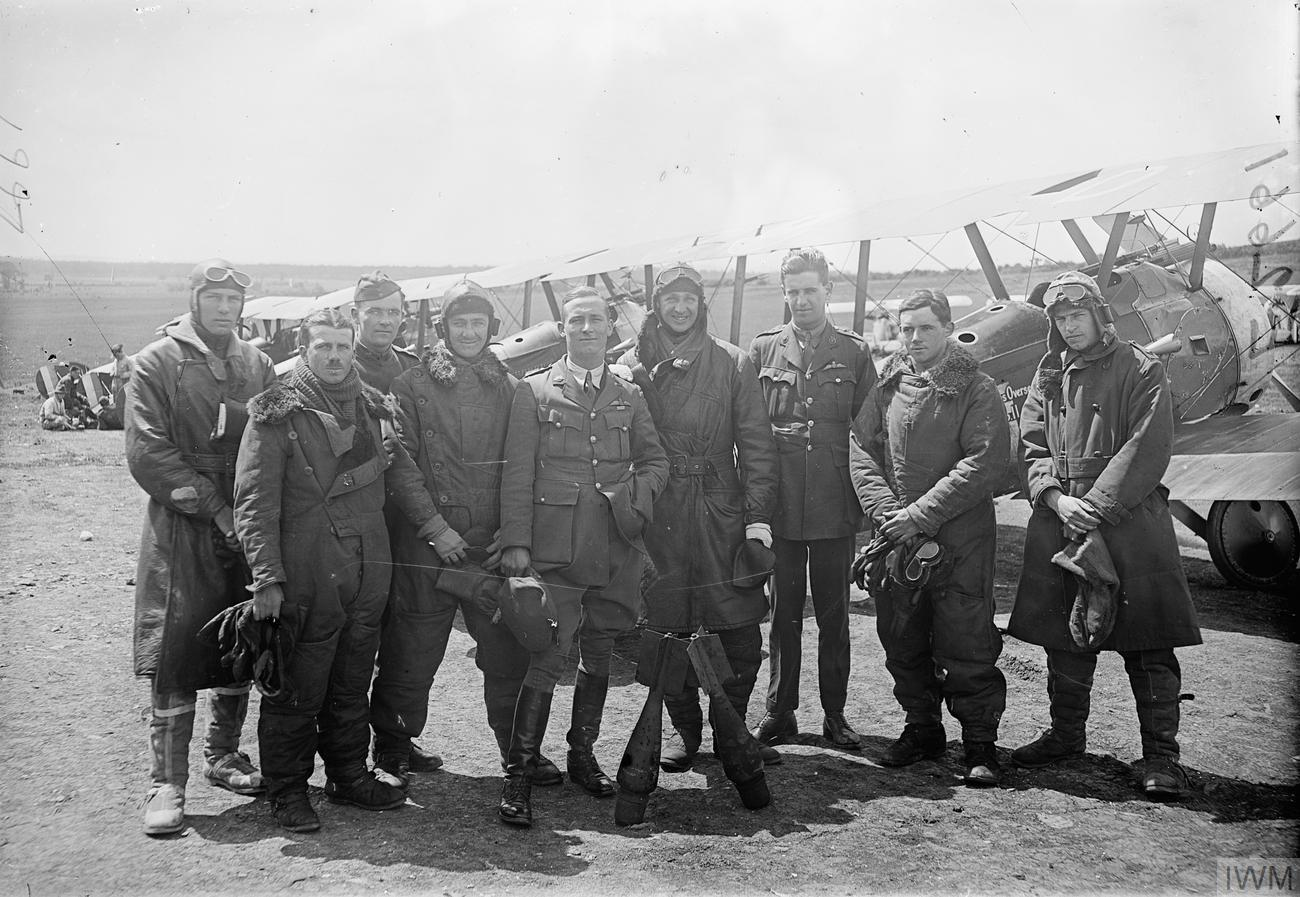
King (fourth from right), Captain Harry Cobby (centre) and fellow officers of No. 4 Squadron AFC with their Sopwith Camels, Western Front, June 1918

King registered his fifth victory, an LVG, after raiding Armentières on 25 July 1918. Four days later, he led a flight of six Camels from No. 4 Squadron escorting Airco DH.9 light bombers of the Royal Air Force in another raid on Armentières. In an action that the Australian official history highlighted as an "example of cool and skilful air fighting", the DH.9s completed their bombing mission while the Camels drove off an attacking force of at least ten German Fokkers, three of the Australians including King claiming victories, without any Allied losses. He destroyed a German two-seater on 3 August and another the following day, sharing the second with Herbert Watson. No. 4 Squadron was heavily engaged in the Allies' great offensive on the Western Front, launched with the Battle of Amiens on 8 August. King was credited with two victories—a balloon and an LVG—near Estaires during a bombing raid on 10 August. On 12 and 13 August, the Camels of No. 4 Squadron operated in a massed formation over Flanders with the S.E.5s of No. 2 Squadron AFC, the former's two flights led by Cobby and King, and the latter's by Adrian Cole and Roy Phillipps. Pickings were scarce and No. 4 Squadron's only success came on the second day when King and his flight collectively destroyed a two-seat Albatros.

On 16 August 1918, King participated in a major assault against the German airfield at Haubourdin, near Lille, that resulted in thirty-seven enemy aircraft being destroyed on the ground. During the action, described by the official history as a "riot of destruction", King set on fire a hangar housing four or five German planes. He also, according to No. 2 Squadron pilot Charles Copp, flew down Haubourdin's main street, waving as he went, his reason being that "the girls in that village must have had a heck of a time with all that bombing and must have been terribly scared so I thought I'd cheer them up a bit". By this time the Lille sector was largely clear of German fighters. The official history recorded that on 25 August, "King went out alone as far as Don railway station, bombed it, machine-gunned a train, and returned among the low clouds—all without seeing any enemy." The only contact around this time was on 30 August, when King, Thomas Baker and another pilot shot down two DFWs near Laventie. On 1 September, King destroyed an observation balloon over Aubers Ridge. Three days later he shot down an LVG after attacking a train near Lille with Cobby. He was recommended for the Distinguished Flying Cross (DFC) on 8 September. The award, promulgated in The London Gazette on 3 December, cited his "gallant and valuable service in bombing and attacking with machine gun fire enemy billets, trains, troops etc", during which "he ensure[d] success by descending to low altitudes, disregarding personal danger". On 16 September, following a lull in aerial combat in the region, King destroyed a Fokker biplane over Lille. Around this time he was promoted to captain and flight commander. He took over "A" Flight from Cobby, who had been posted to England. By the end of September, King's tally was eighteen. He registered his final victory in a Camel on 2 October, when he used bombs to send down his fourth balloon.

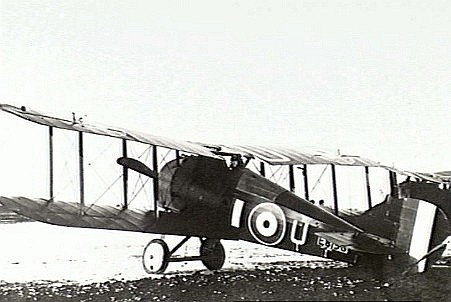
Sopwith Snipe of No. 4 Squadron, c. 1918. King achieved seven victories in the Snipe, making him the most successful pilot of the type.

During October 1918, King converted with the rest of No. 4 Squadron to the upgraded Sopwith Snipe, whose larger cockpit was a better fit for him. He scored with the Snipe on both 28 and 29 October, the latter over Tournai, in what is frequently described as "one of the greatest air battles of the war". At Tournai, amid a confrontation involving over seventy-five Allied and German fighters, King evaded five enemy Fokkers that dived on him, before destroying an LVG in a head-on attack. The next day, he downed three Fokker D.VIIs, two without firing a shot. As he zoomed up from shooting one out of control, he cut off another. This second Fokker pulled up to avoid collision and toppled onto a third Fokker. One of the war's last air battles took place near Leuze on 4 November. King's destruction of two D.VIIs in the space of five minutes, the latter in flames, capped his combat career. His tally of seven victories with the Snipe in the closing days of the war made him the highest-scoring pilot in this type.

King's final wartime score of twenty-six included six aircraft driven down out of control, thirteen aircraft and four balloons destroyed, and three other aircraft destroyed in victories shared with other airmen. This made him second only to Harry Cobby as the most successful ace in the AFC, as well as the fourth most successful of all the Australian aces in the war (his top-scoring compatriots, Robert Little and Roderic (Stan) Dallas, flew with the British Royal Naval Air Service and Royal Air Force). King was recommended for a bar to his DFC, which was upgraded to the Distinguished Service Order and awarded on 3 June 1919. The recommendation noted his victories in the air and described him as having "proved himself a very brilliant patrol leader" and as "a magnificent example at all times to all pilots in the Squadron by his keenness on the ground and gallantry in the air which was of the highest possible order". He was also belatedly mentioned in despatches in July 1919 for his wartime service.

== Interbellum and World War II ==
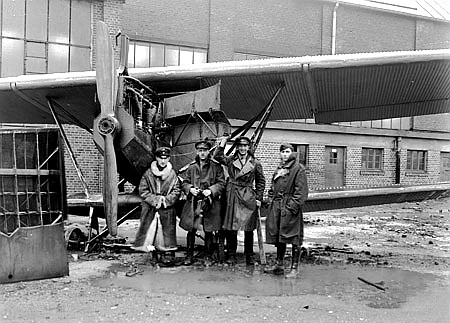
King (second right), Captain George Jones (far right) and other officers of No. 4 Squadron AFC with a German Junkers J.I in Germany, December 1918

Following the end of hostilities, No. 4 Squadron joined the British Army of Occupation at Bickendorf, near Cologne, Germany, in December 1918. The unit returned to England in March 1919, and King sailed with it back to Australia aboard RMS Kaisar-i-Hind on 6 May. He left the AFC on 11 August 1919 in Melbourne, before gaining employment as an air courier for Larkin-Sopwith Aviation Co. of Australasia Ltd, which had been co-founded by fighter ace Herbert Larkin. While working for Larkin-Sopwith, King refused an appointment in the newly established Australian Air Corps (AAC)—forerunner of the Royal Australian Air Force (RAAF)—because it had not then offered a commission to Frank McNamara, VC. In a letter to the AAC selection committee on 30 January 1920, King wrote "I feel I must forfeit my place in favor (sic) of this very good and gallant officer"; McNamara received a commission in the AAC that April.

King's career with Larkin-Sopwith involved many pioneering flights. In 1920 alone, flying a Sopwith Gnu, he was credited with making the first aerial deliveries of mail and newspapers to several cities in eastern Australia, and with making the first aircraft landing at several townships in southern Queensland. He also competed in air races. By April 1922, working with Larkin-Sopwith's successor, Larkin Aircraft Supply Co. Ltd, King was reported as having safely flown 2,000 passengers and 48,000 miles (77,000 km) throughout Victoria, New South Wales and Queensland. He soon left the aviation business to go into partnership with another pilot, T.T. Shipman, founding Shipman, King and Co. Pty Ltd. Importing and building machinery, the company was successful and allowed King to take up the restoration and racing of motor vehicles. He married Josephine Livingston, twenty, at St John's Anglican Church, Camberwell, on 31 March 1925. The couple had a son and a daughter.

In December 1939, soon after the outbreak of World War II, King joined the RAAF as a squadron leader. Initially considered for general flying duties, he was assigned training commands commencing in the new year. On 2 January 1940, he became the inaugural commanding officer of No. 3 Elementary Flying Training School (No. 3 EFTS) in Essendon, Victoria. Part of Australia's contribution to the Empire Air Training Scheme, No. 3 EFTS initially comprised a significant civilian presence, many of the aircraft and staff under King's control being from private airline companies and the Royal Victorian Aero Club; by July, all private machines had been pressed into RAAF service and the civilian element largely disappeared. King assumed command of No. 5 Elementary Flying Training School at Narromine, New South Wales, on 21 December. Promoted to wing commander, he took over No. 1 Service Flying Training School at RAAF Point Cook, Victoria, from Group Captain John McCauley on 7 July 1941. In October, King was promoted to acting group captain and posted to command the newly established Station Headquarters Point Cook.

== Death and legacy ==
King died unexpectedly of cerebral oedema on 28 November 1941, aged 47. Survived by his wife and children, he was cremated at Fawkner Crematorium, Melbourne. His funeral service at South Yarra was attended by hundreds of mourners from the military and civil aviation world, including the Chief of the Air Staff, Air Chief Marshal Sir Charles Burnett, and a representative of the Minister for Air; the pallbearers included Air Vice Marshal Henry Wrigley, Air Commodore Raymond Brownell, Group Captain Allan Walters, and Wing Commander Henry Winneke.

Elwyn Roy King's name appears on panel 97 in the Commemorative Area of the Australian War Memorial, Canberra. His youngest brother Francis, who served as a flying officer with No. 30 Squadron in New Guinea, died in an aircraft crash on 31 May 1943.
