= Herbert Gilles Watson =

Australian flying ace

- Born: 30 March 1889; Caversham, New Zealand
- Died: 29 March 1942 (aged 52); Victoria, Australia
- Military career
- Allegiance: Australia
- Branch: Australian Imperial Force (1914–1917); Australian Flying Corps (1917–1919); Citizen Air Force (1925–1930)
- Service years: 1914–1919; 1925–1930
- Rank: Flight Lieutenant
- Unit: No. 4 Squadron AFC
- Conflicts: First World War
- Awards: Distinguished Flying Cross
- Other work: Horse breeder

Herbert Gilles Watson, DFC (30 March 1889 – 29 March 1942) was an Australian flying ace of the First World War credited with 14 aerial victories. He was the highest scoring New Zealand-born ace in the Australian Flying Corps, and the fourth highest scorer in his squadron.

== Early life and service ==
Although born in New Zealand, Watson was a clerk working in Sydney, Australia, at the outbreak of war. He enlisted in No. 2 Troop of the Australian Army Signal Corps on 28 October 1914. He left Australia in December 1914, sailing for the Middle East; he trained in Egypt. He served at Gallipoli in 1915, and was medically evacuated with wounds, to England.

== Aerial service ==
Watson transferred to the Australian Flying Corps in 1917, and was trained in England. On 5 February 1918, he was assigned to 4 Squadron AFC as a Sopwith Camel pilot. He drove an Albatros D.V down out of control for his first victory, on 19 April 1918. He steadily accumulated triumphs, shooting down eight aircraft by the end of June. Watson was subsequently awarded the Distinguished Flying Cross (DFC) in mid-July. His final tally was three enemy observation balloons destroyed, including one set afire; four enemy fighters destroyed; an enemy observation plane destroyed in conjunction with Lieutenant Elwyn King; four enemy fighters and an observation plane driven down out of control. As he completed his string of wins, he was appointed a flight commander with the rank of captain.

== After World War I ==
Postwar, Watson became a horse breeder in Victoria. He died on 29 March 1942 in Victoria, Australia; his will named his widow, Rosalie Grace Watson, as executor of his estate.

== Honours and awards ==
Text of citation for Distinguished Flying Cross (DFC)

Lt. Herbert Gillis Watson (Australian Flying Corps). Whilst on offensive patrol he encountered several Pfalz scouts, one of which he shot down. He has also in three weeks shot down four enemy machines and destroyed a balloon, attacking the latter at 6,000 feet, following it down to 1,000 feet, when it burst into flames.
