= No. 5 Elementary Flying Training School RAAF =

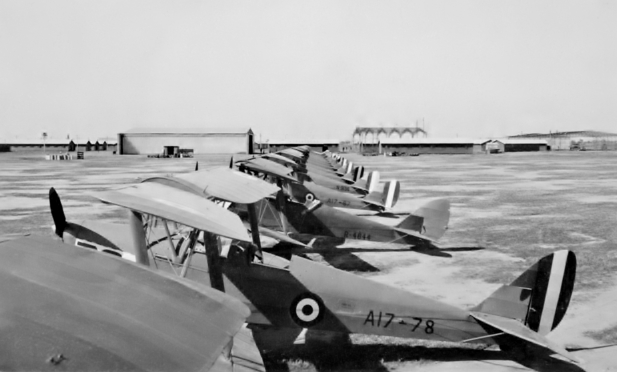
- Tiger Moth trainers of No. 5 Elementary Flying Training School at Narromine, New South Wales
- Active: 1940–44
- Country: Australia
- Branch: Royal Australian Air Force
- Role: Introductory flying training
- Part of: Central Area Command
- Garrison/HQ: Narromine, New South Wales
- Engagements: World War II

Commanders
- Notable commanders: Roy King (1940–41)

Aircraft flown
- Trainer: Tiger Moth

No. 5 Elementary Flying Training School (No. 5 EFTS) was a Royal Australian Air Force (RAAF) pilot training unit that operated during World War II. It was one of twelve elementary flying training schools employed by the RAAF to provide introductory flight instruction to new pilots as part of Australia's contribution to the Empire Air Training Scheme. No. 5 EFTS was established in June 1940 at Narromine, New South Wales, and primarily operated Tiger Moths. It ceased training in June 1944, after more than 3,700 students had passed through.

== History ==
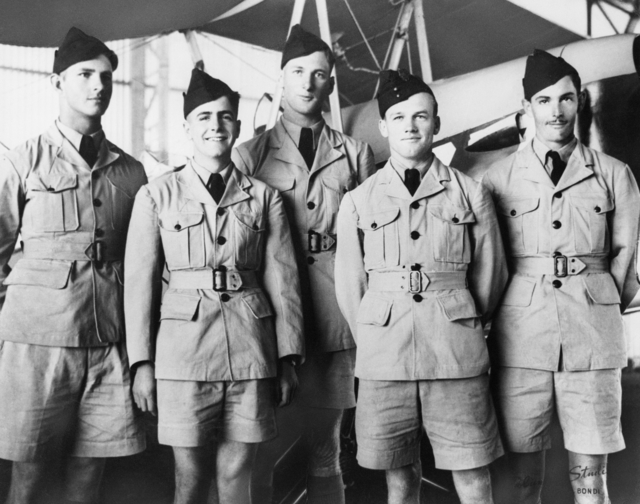
Students of No. 5 EFTS, including Ron Middleton (far right), later to be awarded the Victoria Cross

Flying instruction in the Royal Australian Air Force (RAAF) underwent major changes following the outbreak of World War II, in response to a vast increase in the number of aircrew volunteers and the commencement of Australia's participation in the Empire Air Training Scheme (EATS). The Air Force's pre-war pilot training facility, No. 1 Flying Training School at RAAF Station Point Cook, Victoria, was supplanted in 1940–41 by twelve elementary flying training schools (EFTS) and eight service flying training schools (SFTS). The EFTS provided a twelve-week introductory flying course to personnel who had graduated from one of the RAAF's initial training schools. Flying training was undertaken in two stages: the first involved four weeks of instruction (including ten hours of flying) to determine trainees' suitability to become pilots. Those that passed this grading process then received a further eight weeks of training (including sixty-five hours of flying) at the EFTS. Pilots who successfully completed this course were posted to an SFTS in either Australia or Canada for the next stage of their instruction as military aviators.

No. 5 Elementary Flying Training School (No. 5 EFTS) was formed at Narromine, New South Wales, on 24 May 1940, and came under the control of Central Area Command, headquartered in Sydney. Its inaugural commanding officer was Squadron Leader T.C. Curnow, who was previously in charge of No. 2 Elementary Flying Training School at Archerfield, Queensland. No. 5 EFTS's airfield had been home to the Narromine Aero Club before being taken over by the RAAF. Twenty de Havilland Tiger Moth training aircraft were flown in from Laverton, Victoria, on 24 June, and flying training commenced three days later when the first forty-six students arrived from No. 1 Initial Training School. Within a month, student numbers had grown to ninety-four, and the school's total strength was 346.

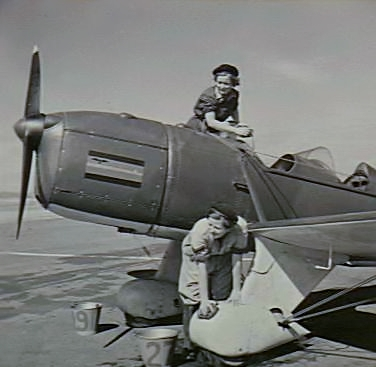
WAAAF ground crew of No. 5 EFTS washing a Ryan aircraft flown by the chief flying instructor

As of 30 June 1940, only one of the No. 5 EFTS's four required hangars had been completed. Accommodation facilities were, according to the unit operations book, "bleak and depressing" and deficiencies in equipment were "too numerous for itemising". The primitive conditions meant that personnel suffered adverse health effects from the cold in winter and hot, dusty conditions in the summer. Flying at Narromine was also hampered by bad weather, particularly heavy rain and wind. Accidents were frequent at all EFTSs, though fatalities were rare. An instructor and his passenger from No. 5 EFTS were killed when a Tiger Moth crashed on 3 August 1940, possibly caused by a stall while practising forced landings. By the end of August, the school was operating one of its two required Link Trainer simulators.

As of 30 September 1940, total strength was 467, including 114 trainees. One student died and five others were injured off duty when the balcony of the Federal Hotel in Narromine collapsed on 11 November. An instructor was killed and his pupil injured when their Tiger Moth stalled while attempting to avoid collision with another aircraft on 3 December. Later that month, Squadron Leader Roy King, a fighter ace in the Australian Flying Corps during World War I, took over command of the school, serving until June 1941. By that time, some 500 pupils had graduated from No. 5 EFTS; the wastage rate was just under twenty per cent. Among the graduates was R.H. (Ron) Middleton, who subsequently flew with the Royal Air Force in Europe and was awarded a posthumous Victoria Cross for his actions piloting a Short Stirling bomber in November 1942.

Night-flying training commenced at No. 5 EFTS in July 1941. As of 30 April 1942, the school's strength was 845 personnel, including 319 students, the increase owing to an influx of staff and students from No. 2 EFTS and No. 6 Elementary Flying Training School in Tamworth, New South Wales, both of which had been disbanded in March. By July 1943, total strength stood at 748, including thirty-three members of the Women's Auxiliary Australian Air Force (WAAAF); the unit was operating eighty-seven Tiger Moths and one Ryan. In April 1944, WAAAF numbers reached eighty-four out of a total strength of 703; the aircraft complement was eighty-six Tiger Moths, seventy-one of which were serviceable, and two CAC Wacketts, neither serviceable. No. 48 Course passed out on 15 June 1944, after which training at the school ceased. Three other courses then under way were completed at other EFTSs. By 25 June, all of the school's Tiger Moths had been transferred to other locations. A total of 3,734 students had passed through No. 5 EFTS, 2,850 of whom graduated as pilots.
