= Nicky Barr =

Royal Australian Air Force officer

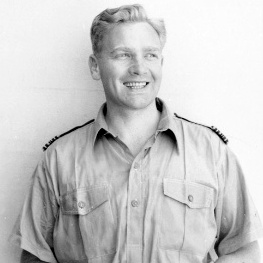
- Barr during World War II
- Born: Andrew William Barr; 10 December 1915; Wellington, New Zealand
- Died: 12 June 2006 (aged 90); Gold Coast, Queensland, Australia
- Military career
- Allegiance: Australia
- Branch: Royal Australian Air Force
- Service years: 1940–1945; 1951–1953
- Rank: Wing Commander
- Units: No. 23 Squadron (1940–41); No. 3 Squadron (1941–42); No. 2 Operational Training Unit (1944–45)
- Conflicts: World War II; Middle Eastern theatre; North African Campaign; European theatre; Normandy Campaign; South West Pacific theatre
- Awards: Officer of the Order of the British Empire; Military Cross; Distinguished Flying Cross & Bar
- Other work: Company director

Andrew William "Nicky" Barr, OBE, MC, DFC & Bar (10 December 1915 – 12 June 2006) was a member of the Australian national rugby union team, who became a fighter ace in the Royal Australian Air Force (RAAF) during World War II. He was credited with 12 aerial victories, all scored flying the Curtiss P-40 fighter.

Born in New Zealand, Barr was raised in Victoria and first represented the state in rugby in 1936. Selected to play for Australia in the United Kingdom in 1939, he had just arrived in England when the tour was cancelled following the outbreak of war. He joined the RAAF in 1940 and was posted to North Africa with No. 3 Squadron in September 1941. The squadron's highest-scoring ace, he attained his first three victories in the P-40 Tomahawk and the remainder in the P-40 Kittyhawk.

Barr's achievements as a combat pilot earned him the Distinguished Flying Cross and Bar. Shortly after taking command of No. 3 Squadron in May 1942, he was shot down and captured by Axis forces, and incarcerated in Italy. He escaped and assisted other Allied fugitives to safety, receiving for his efforts the Military Cross, a rare honour for an RAAF pilot. Repatriated to England, he saw action during the invasion of Normandy in June 1944 before returning to Australia as chief instructor with No. 2 Operational Training Unit. After the war he became a company director, and rejoined the RAAF as an active reserve officer from 1951 to 1953. From the early 1960s he was heavily involved in the oilseed industry, for which he was appointed an Officer of the Order of the British Empire in 1983. He died in 2006, aged 90.

== Early career ==
Andrew Barr was born in Wellington, New Zealand, on 10 December 1915; he had a twin brother, Jack. The family moved to Australia when the boys were six. Growing up in Melbourne, Andrew attended Kew Public School and played Australian rules football. He was also the Victorian Schoolboys' 100 yards athletics champion three years in succession, from 1926 to 1928. In 1931, aged fifteen, he began his association with the Lord Somers Camp and Power House social and sporting organisations located at Western Port. After leaving school, Barr studied construction at Swinburne Technical College, but later took a diploma course in accountancy and made it his profession. He started playing rugby union in 1935 through a friend in the Power House club. Weighing 80 kilograms (180 lb) and just under 6 feet (180 cm) tall, Barr gained selection for Victoria as a hooker the following year. In 1939, he was chosen to play in the United Kingdom with the Australian national team, the Wallabies. The tour was cancelled less than a day after the team arrived in the UK on 2 September, due to the outbreak of World War II. Keen to serve as a fighter pilot, Barr initially tried to enlist in the Royal Air Force, but withdrew his application when told that it was unlikely he would fly anytime in the near future, and that he could expect only administrative duties in the interim.

Returning to Australia on the RMS Strathaird, Barr joined the Royal Australian Air Force as an air cadet on 4 March 1940. After undergoing instruction on Tiger Moths at No. 3 Elementary Flying Training School, Essendon, and on Hawker Demons and Avro Ansons at No. 1 Service Flying Training School, Point Cook, he was commissioned as a pilot officer on 24 September. He gained a reputation as something of a rebel during training, and became forever known as "Nicky", for "Old Nick", or the Devil. In his quest to gain assignment as a fighter pilot, he had deliberately aimed poorly during bombing practice, a stratagem also adopted by at least two of his fellow students. By November 1940, he had been posted to No. 23 (City of Brisbane) Squadron, flying CAC Wirraways on patrol off the Queensland coast. The aircraft was, according to Barr, "our front line fighter in those days, but it didn't take too long to realise that the capacity of the Wirraway, compared with the types of planes that we were going to encounter, left much to be desired". Though his duties frustrated him somewhat, Barr was grateful to have this extensive flight experience under his belt when he eventually saw combat. While based in Queensland, he served as honorary aide-de-camp to the Governor, Sir Leslie Wilson, and also captained the RAAF rugby union team. He was promoted to flying officer on 24 March 1941.

== Combat service ==
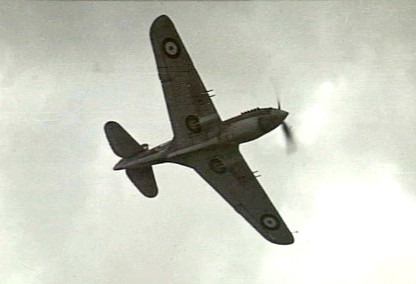
RAAF P-40 Tomahawk in North Africa

Barr was posted to North Africa on 28 September 1941, to fly with No. 3 Squadron under the command of Squadron Leader Peter Jeffrey. He converted to P-40 Tomahawk fighters at an RAF operational training unit in Khartoum. There he also received his "goolie chit", a piece of paper to be shown to local tribesmen in the event he was shot down, reading in Arabic: "don't kill the bearer, feed him and protect him, take him to the English and you will be rewarded. Peace be upon you." Returning to North Africa, Barr achieved his first aerial victory, over a Messerschmitt Bf 110, on 12 December. He followed this up with a Junkers Ju 88 and a Messerschmitt Bf 109 the next day. The squadron then re-equipped with P-40 Kittyhawks; Barr was flying the new model when he became an ace on New Year's Day 1942, shooting down two Junkers Ju 87 Stukas. On 8 March, he led a flight of six Kittyhawks to intercept a raid on Tobruk by twelve Ju 87s escorted by ten Macchi C. 202s and two Bf 109s. The Australians destroyed six Macchis and three Ju 87s without loss, Barr personally accounting for one of the Macchis.

Eventually credited with victories over twelve enemy aircraft, plus two probables and eight damaged, Barr became No. 3 Squadron's highest-scoring member. He flew a total of eighty-four combat sorties, twenty of them in one fortnight, and six on 16 June 1942 alone. His philosophy was that the P-40 was not a top-class fighter, but that its shortcomings "could be offset by unbridled aggression", so he resolved to treat aerial combat as he would a boxing match and "overcome much better opponents by simply going for them". Bobby Gibbes became No. 3 Squadron's commanding officer in February 1942, and made Barr his senior flight commander. Promoted to flight lieutenant on 1 April, Barr was raised to acting squadron leader and appointed to command the unit in May, barely six months after he commenced operations, following Gibbes's hospitalisation with a broken ankle. Barr had never sought leadership of the squadron, and felt that others were just as well qualified for the role. As a commander he delegated most administrative tasks to his adjutant but, contrary to normal practice, wrote letters to the next-of-kin of casualties himself.

... it had two guns firing from the cockpit and four – two in each wing – to augment it. And I liked very much indeed the loading of the guns when one took off. There was a closeness to combat which seemed to help me with my make-up, the smell of cordite in the cockpit was particularly helpful to me; I really felt that I was at a war.

— Nicky Barr on the P-40 Tomahawk, interview, 1990

Barr was shot down three times while serving with No. 3 Squadron. The first occasion was on 11 January 1942 when, having destroyed a Bf 109 and a Fiat G.50, he was preparing to touch down in the desert to pick up a fellow pilot who had crash landed. Barr was halfway through lowering his undercarriage when he was "jumped" by two other Bf 109s. He immediately engaged both and shot one down before more German fighters arrived and he was hit and forced to land behind enemy lines. As one of the German pilots came in low to strafe the downed Kittyhawk, Barr ran straight at it in an attempt to throw the pilot off his aim, and was injured by fragments of rock sent airborne by the impact of cannon shells. A tribe of friendly Senussi Arabs found him, dressed his wounds, and helped him return to Allied lines. For his exploit, and his earlier successes, Barr was awarded the Distinguished Flying Cross (DFC), the complete citation being published in the London Gazette on 20 February 1942:

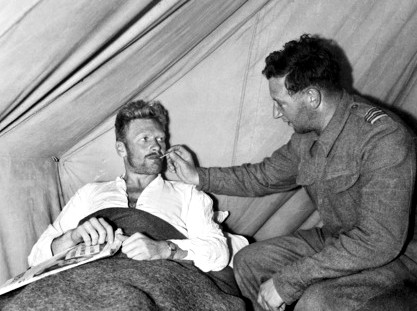
Barr has his temperature taken by a medical officer following his return to base three days after being shot down behind enemy lines, January 1942.

This officer, who commenced operational flying in November, 1941, has displayed the greatest keenness and skill as a fighter pilot. In December, 1941, during a patrol over the Derna area, he shot down a Messerschmitt 110; the next day, in the same area, he destroyed a Messerschmitt 110 and a Junkers 88. One day in January, 1942, his squadron formed part of an escort to bomber aircraft operating over El Agheila. Enemy aircraft were encountered and, in the ensuing engagement, Flying Officer Barr attacked 2 Italian fighters, one of which he shot down. He then observed one of his fellow pilots, who had been shot down, waving to him from the ground but, when preparing to make a landing in an attempt to rescue him, Flying Officer Barr was attacked by 2 Messerschmitt 109s. Although the undercarriage of his aircraft was not fully retracted, he immediately manoeuvred to engage the attackers, only to find that his guns had jammed. Quickly rectifying the fault he delivered an accurate burst of fire which caused one of the Messerschmitts to disintegrate in the air. A further 2 enemy aircraft joined in the combat and Flying Officer Barr was wounded and forced down. While on the ground he was further wounded by the enemy's fire but, despite this, he made his way through the enemy's lines and rejoined our own forces some 3 days later. He brought back much valuable information regarding the disposition of enemy tanks and defences. Flying Officer Barr displayed the greatest courage and tenacity throughout. He has destroyed 8 enemy aircraft.

On 25 May 1942, Barr had to land in the desert when his engine overheated. Having just taken off the engine cowling, he spotted enemy tanks approaching and immediately took off with the engine exposed to the elements, safely landing back at base. He was shot down for the second time on 30 May, when he engaged eight Bf 109s and destroyed one before being hit and forced to crash land at high speed in no-man's land. He came down in a minefield during a fierce tank battle, and was forced to remain where he was as troops of both sides slowly converged on him; British forces managed to reach him first and, after treatment for wounds, he again returned to his squadron. On 26 June, after being attacked by two Bf 109s and bailing out of his burning Kittyhawk, he was captured by Italian soldiers and taken as a prisoner-of-war, first to Tobruk, and then to Italy, where he received hospital treatment for serious wounds. He later learned that the pilot who shot him down was Oberleutnant Werner Schroer, a Luftwaffe ace credited with sixty-one victories in North Africa. Bobby Gibbes, having recovered from his own injuries, again took command of No. 3 Squadron. During his incarceration, on 5 February 1943, Barr was awarded a Bar to his DFC for "destroying further enemy aircraft".

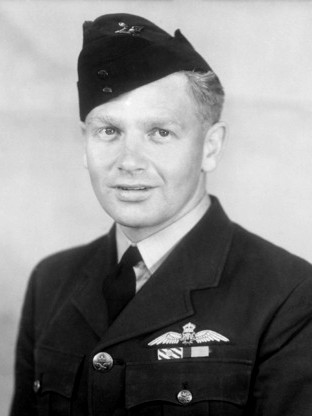
Barr in London, April 1944

Barr tried to escape from his confinement four times. By November 1942 he had recovered sufficiently from the injuries he received in June to break out of the hospital where he was being held in Bergamo, northern Italy. He made his way to the Swiss border, but was challenged by an Italian customs official, whom he struck with a rock before being recaptured. Court-martialled on a charge of murder, he only avoided a death sentence when the Swiss Red Cross colonel representing him located the official and proved that he had not died. Barr was instead sentenced to ninety days solitary confinement in Gavi Prison Camp, Genoa. In August 1943, with Italy on the verge of surrender, prisoners of war were rounded up for transport to Germany. Barr jumped from a moving train bound for the Brenner Pass and joined a group of Italian partisans in Pontremoli, remaining at large for two months before again being captured. Taken to a transit camp just over the Austrian border, Barr and fourteen other prisoners escaped by tunnelling under the barbed wire. Eventually he managed to link up with an Allied special operations unit, which was gathering intelligence behind enemy lines, sabotaging Axis infrastructure, and helping Allied prisoners and Italian refugees escape over the Apennine Mountains along the so-called "Alpine Route". He was recaptured and escaped once more before finally making it through the Alpine crossing himself, leading a group of more than twenty. After reaching friendly lines in March 1944, he was sent to a military hospital in Vasto, weighing only 55 kilograms (121 lb) and in poor health, suffering malaria, malnutrition, and blood poisoning. The assistance he rendered to fellow Allied fugitives earned him the Military Cross (MC) for "Exceptional courage in organising escapes"; the award was gazetted on 1 December 1944. He is thought to be one of only five or six RAAF pilots to receive the MC during World War II.

Posted to Britain in April 1944, Barr went ashore at Omaha Beach two days after D-Day as part of an air support control unit. During the campaign in Normandy, he flew rocket-armed Hawker Typhoons on operations against V-1 flying bomb launch sites. After his return to Australia on 11 September, Barr was promoted to acting wing commander and appointed chief instructor at No. 2 Operational Training Unit in Mildura, Victoria, taking over from Bobby Gibbes. He also went to New Guinea and flew some ground-attack missions in the Kittyhawk to gain experience in the South West Pacific theatre. Following the end of hostilities in August 1945, Barr was treated for recurring fever and underwent two operations on his limbs in No. 6 RAAF Hospital, Heidelberg. He was discharged from the Air Force on 8 October.

== Later life ==
I was not very proud of the things that I was called upon to do. Nonetheless, I accepted the fact that some people have to do the killing. But when you are recruited, it's not sold to you that way and you find out that after they teach you to fly they then teach you to kill. And, uh, I didn't like it at all, but I did it – that was my job.

— Nicky Barr, Australian Story, 2002

After leaving the Air Force, Barr remained in Mildura with his wife, Dorothy (Dot). They had met on a blind date in 1938 and been married only a few weeks when Nicky joined the RAAF. During the war she was told on three occasions that her husband was dead. The couple had two sons, born in 1945 and 1947. Barr's injuries prevented him from returning to a rugby career, and he took up yachting as a sport. He also briefly assisted fellow No. 3 Squadron veteran Bobby Gibbes in an airline venture in New Guinea, before going into business as a company manager and director with civil engineering and pharmaceutical firms. Barr rejoined the RAAF on 20 March 1951 as a pilot in the active Citizen Air Force (CAF), with the acting rank of wing commander. On 15 April 1953, he transferred to the CAF reserve. A member of the Royal Air Forces Escaping Society, Barr began travelling to Italy with his wife on a regular basis in the late 1950s to seek out and offer assistance to those who had helped him during his wartime escape attempts.

In 1961, Barr became General Manager of Meggitt Ltd, an oilseed-crushing firm; he eventually rose to become Executive Chairman. The firm's board was joined in 1971 by the recently retired Chief of the Air Staff, Air Marshal Sir Alister Murdoch. Barr's work in the industry led to his appointment in the 1983 New Year Honours as an Officer of the Order of the British Empire (OBE). The same year, he became Australian representative and Chairman of the International Oil Seed Group. In June 1987, Barr accepted an invitation to join John Glenn, Chuck Yeager, and fifteen other famed flyers in a so-called "Gathering of Eagles" for a seminar at the USAF Air Command and Staff College in Montgomery, Alabama. Generally reluctant to talk publicly about the war, he agreed to discuss his experiences during an episode of the television series Australian Story in 2002, appearing with his biographer Peter Dornan, and Bobby Gibbes. By this time Barr was said to be receiving daily treatment for the injuries he had suffered in combat. He died at the age of ninety on 12 June 2006, a few months after his wife. Four F/A-18 Hornet jet fighters from No. 3 Squadron overflew his funeral service on the Gold Coast, Queensland. He was further honoured at a rugby test match between Australia and England at Telstra Dome in Melbourne on 17 June, the day after his funeral. On 14 September 2006, No. 3 Squadron dedicated a stone memorial in Barr's honour; the unveiling was attended by his sons Bob and Brian.

== Notes ==
Military offices
Preceded by Squadron Leader Bobby Gibbes	Commanding Officer No. 3 Squadron RAAF; May–June 1942	Succeeded by Squadron Leader Bobby Gibbes
