= No. 8 Operational Training Unit RAAF =

No. 8 Operational Training Unit (8OTU) was an operational training unit of the Royal Australian Air Force located at RAAF Station Narromine, Narromine, New South Wales from 1942.

8OTU moved to RAAF Station Parkes, Parkes, New South Wales in 1944.
