= Pat Bourke (footballer, born 1923) =

Australian rules footballer

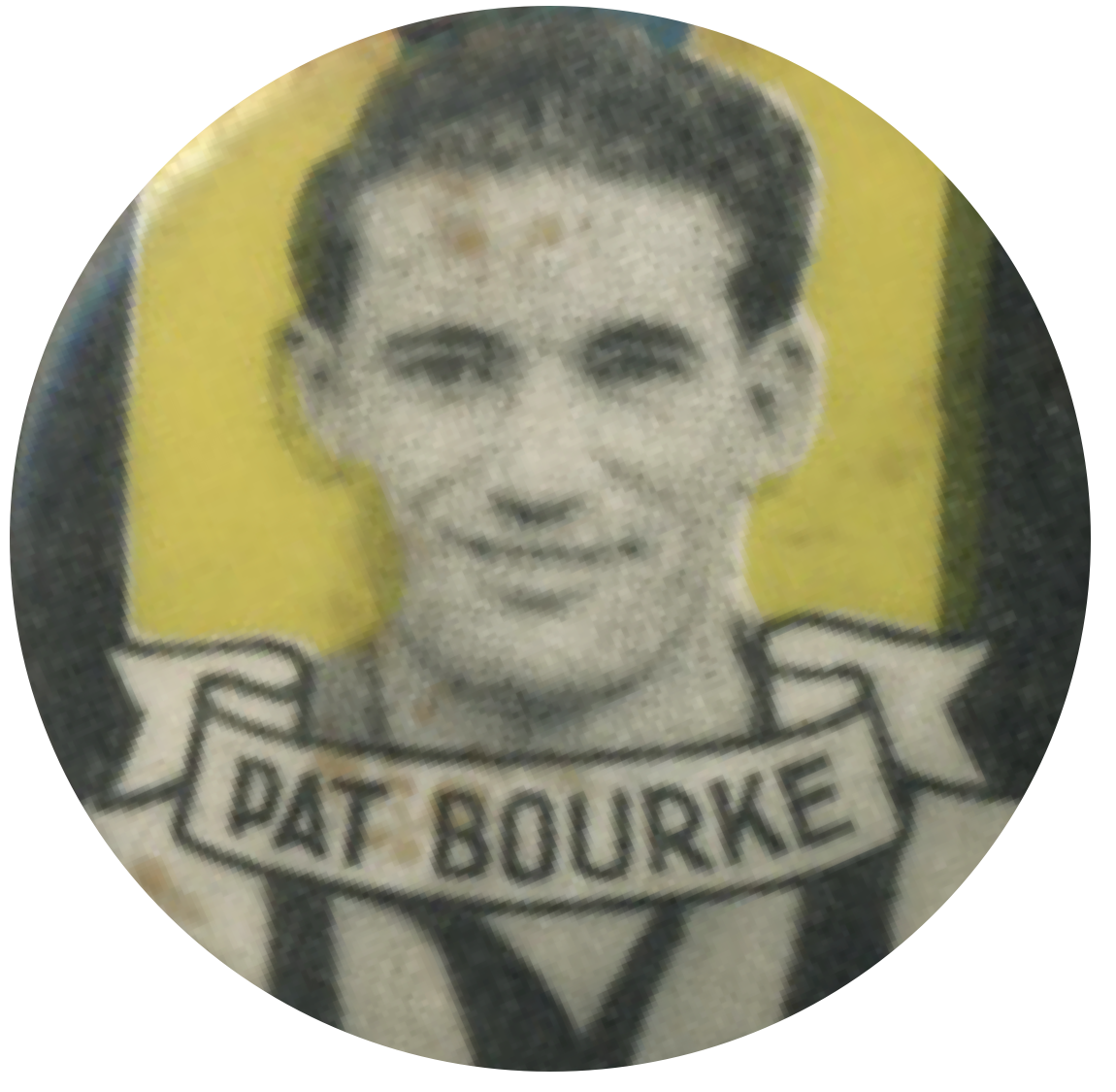
- Pat Bourke 1950

Personal information
- Full name: Patrick Valentine Bourke
- Born: 6 November 1923; Preston, Victoria
- Died: 23 September 2005 (aged 81)
- Original team: Albert Park
- Height: 183 cm (6 ft 0 in)
- Weight: 80 kg (176 lb)

Playing career^{1}
Years	Club	Games (Goals)
1944, 1946–49	South Melbourne	36 (0)
1950-1953	Sandringham	66 (0)
- ^{1} Playing statistics correct to the end of 1953.

Patrick Valentine Bourke (6 November 1923 – 23 September 2005) was an Australian rules footballer who played with South Melbourne in the Victorian Football League (VFL), and Sandringham in the Victorian Football Association (VFA).

== Personal life ==
Bourke served as a lance corporal in the Australian Army during the Second World War. He was a member of the Gliding Club of Victoria.
