= No. 618 Squadron RAF =

RAF squadron intended to carry bouncing bomb

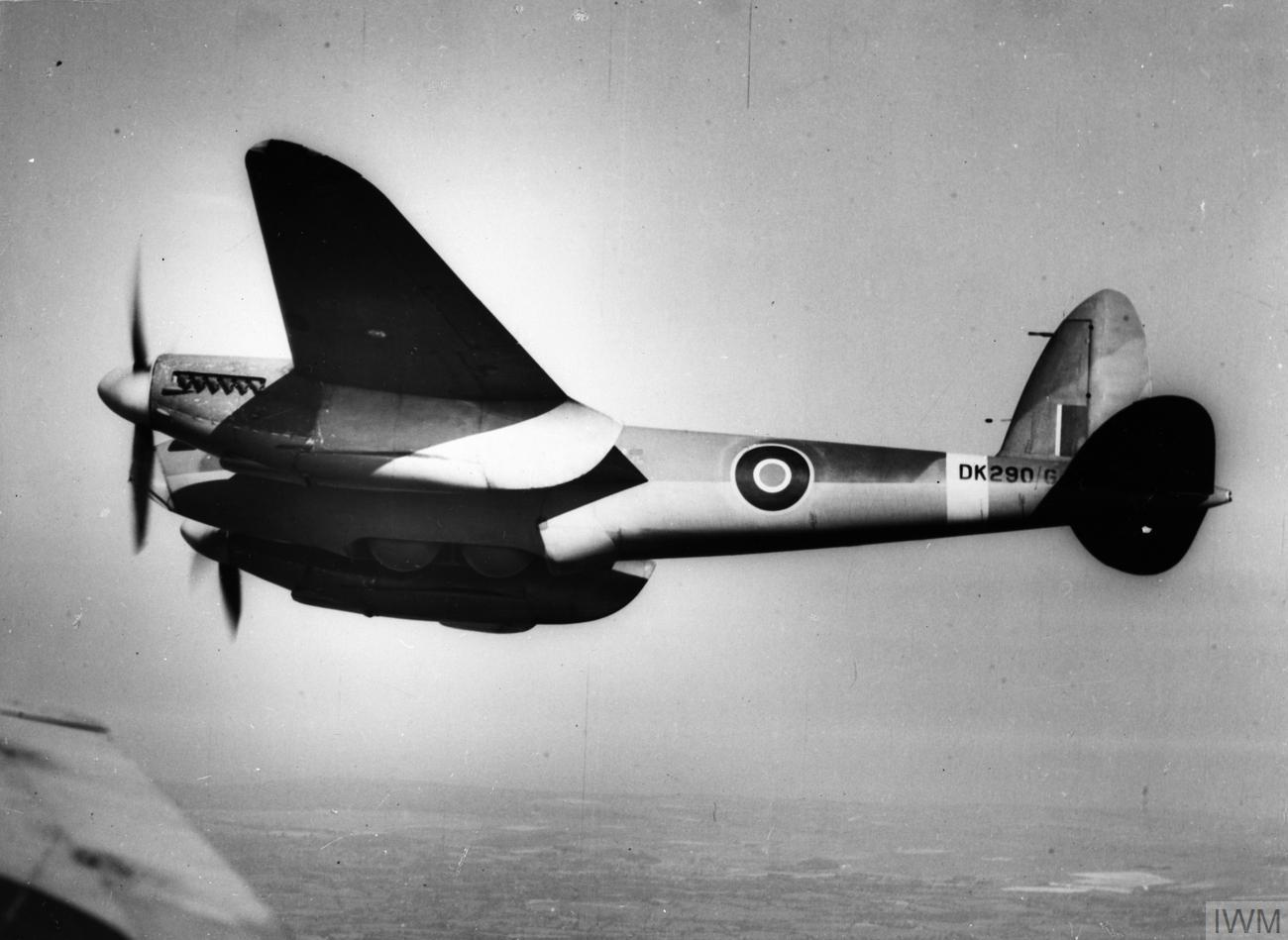
- Mosquito B Mark IV development aircraft, DK290/G of the Aeroplane and Armament Experimental Establishment based at Boscombe Down, Wiltshire, in flight following modification to its deepened bomb bay to accommodate two "Highball" weapons for trials, March 1943
- Active: 1 April 1943 – 14 July 1945
- Country: United Kingdom
- Branch: Royal Air Force

Insignia
- Squadron Badge heraldry: No badge authorised
- Squadron codes: No markings known to be carried

Aircraft flown
- Attack: Bristol Beaufighter; Twin-engined fighter
- Bomber: De Havilland Mosquito; Twin-engined light bomber Fairey Barracuda; Single-engined torpedo bomber-dive bomber

No. 618 Squadron RAF was a squadron of the Royal Air Force during the Second World War, intended to carry off a variation of the Barnes Wallis-designed bouncing bomb code-named "Highball". Due to various circumstances the "Highball" weapon was never used, and the squadron disbanded at the end of the war.

== History ==
=== Formation ===
No. 618 Squadron was first formed at RAF Skitten on 1 April 1943, as part of No. 18 Group of Coastal Command, from crews of No. 105 Squadron RAF and No. 139 Squadron RAF. The unit was initially equipped with Beaufighter Mk.II fighter-bombers, but quickly changed to converted Mosquito Mk.IVs.

==== The Highball ====
The "Highball" device was intended to bounce across the sea until it hit an enemy ship, sank and exploded. Unlike the cylindrical Upkeep weapon used by No. 617 Squadron RAF in Operation Chastise, the "Highball" was more spherical. The Mosquito selected for the conversion work to carry "Highball" was the Mk.IV series II: the work entailed removing the bomb bay doors and equipping the aircraft with specialised carriers enabling them to carry two "Highballs", each weighing 1,280 lb (580 kg), in tandem. The bombs were designed to skip across water and to provide weapon stability and accuracy. Before release they were spun backwards at 700 to 900 rpm by a ram air turbine mounted in the bomb bay's midsection, fed by an extendable air scoop. The bombs were to be dropped from a maximum altitude of 60 ft (20 m) at a speed of 360 mph (600 km/h).

In the event, through lack of weapons, training and aircraft, No. 618 Squadron was kept frustratingly inactive and never attacked the Tirpitz. Instead, the unit was selected for carrier-borne operations in the Pacific.

For this role 25 Mosquito B.Mk.IVs were further modified:

- Each aircraft was equipped with Merlin 25s, adapted to provide peak power at low altitudes, driving four-bladed Rotol propellers: these propellers had narrower blades than the standard three-bladed units, meaning that the engines would rev up faster and respond quicker to throttle movement, factors vital in the limited length of carrier takeoffs.
- Longer intakes under the engine cowlings were fitted with tropical filters.
- The undercarriage legs were made of heavier-gauge metals and the wheels were fitted with the twin brake units of FB Mk VIs.
- The rear fuselages were structurally modified with a special internal longeron and reinforced bulkheads designed to take the additional loads imposed by carrier landings: an additional bulkhead (No. 5a) was fitted.
- Externally a "V-frame" arrestor hook was fitted. The "snap gear" which released the hook was operated by a Bowden cable from a lever mounted on the cockpit port side.
- An access hatch was moved from the starboard rear fuselage to underneath, and an extra longitudinal stiffening strake, identical to that already fitted to the starboard side of production Mosquitos, was fitted to the port fuselage.
- The tailwheel fork pivots incorporated end plates to avoid being caught in the arrestor cables.
- Armoured windscreens were fitted, along with hydraulic wipers.
- Three PR.Mk.XVIs, which were to be used for reconnaissance duties were also fitted with the four-bladed propellers and fuselage modifications for carrier operations.

=== UK squadron movements ===
The squadron's primary target was designated as the Kriegsmarine Surface Fleet, primarily the battleship Tirpitz, so the squadron remained training in Scotland and waiting for the Surface Fleet to sortie into the North Sea until July 1944, when this threat had lessened. As a matter of fact, the German Surface Fleet never emerged from its bases in Norway. In the meantime, the squadron had moved to RAF Wick and re-equipped with Mosquito Mk.VIs and No. 618 Squadron did not have had the opportunity to use the "Highball" weapon. In August 1944, the squadron deployed to RAF Beccles in Suffolk, and in September changed aircraft again to Mosquito Mk.XVIs. The squadron deployed to RAF Benson in September, transitioning to Mosquito Mk.XVIIIs in October.

=== Australian deployment ===
In December 1944, No. 618 Squadron was deployed to Australia for carrier-borne operations, as Japanese targets for the "Highball" weapon were still available there. These Mosquitos were transported to Australia on board the carriers HMS Fencer and Striker, arriving on 23 December 1944, subsequently sent to the de Havilland Australia's Mascot, Fishermans Bend aircraft factory for reassembly. In order to keep up aircrew proficiency and safeguard the modified Mosquitos, 12 disassembled FB Mk VIs were also sent, arriving in Sydney in February 1945. Training began at Narromine that month A detachment was sent to British Pacific Fleet base at Manus Island in March, but the squadron was unable to go into action against Japanese shipping, mostly because there was no target left in the area anymore.

Due to political-strategic infighting between the British Pacific Fleet and the U.S. military, the unit was never in action, and was disbanded (officially) at RAAF Station Narromine on 14 July 1945. The converted Mosquitos were stripped of all military equipment and sold off. The sole surviving No. 618 Squadron Mosquito, an FB. Mk.VI HR621, is currently undergoing restoration at the Camden Museum of Aviation.

== Aircraft operated ==
Aircraft operated by No. 618 Squadron RAF, data from
| From | To | Aircraft | Variant |
|---|---|---|---|
| April 1943 | June 1943 | Bristol Beaufighter | Mk.II |
| April 1943 | June 1945 | de Havilland Mosquito | Mk.IV |
| July 1944 | October 1944 | de Havilland Mosquito | Mk.VI |
| October 1944 | June 1945 | de Havilland Mosquito | Mk.XVI |
| December 1944 | December 1944 | Fairey Barracuda | Mk.II |
| March 1945 | June 1945 | de Havilland Mosquito | Mk.VI |

== Commanding officers ==
Officers commanding No. 618 Squadron, data from
| From | To | Name |
|---|---|---|
| April 1943 | April 1943 | S/Ldr. C.T. Rose, DFC, DFM |
| April 1943 | September 1943 | W/Cdr. G.H.B. Hutchinson |
| September 1943 | July 1944 | F/O. H.B. Mcready |
| July 1944 | October 1944 | W/Cdr. G.H.B. Hutchinson |
| October 1944 | July 1945 | G/Cpt. R.C. Keary |
