= Gliding Club of Victoria =

Flying club in Victoria, Australia

- Formation: 1929
- Headquarters: Benalla
- Members: 240+
- Website: https://www.glidingclub.org.au

The Gliding Club of Victoria was founded in 1929. Since 1953, it has been located at Benalla Airport.

== History ==
The Gliding Club of Victoria was founded on 27 September 1929 by six members of the Citizen Air Force. It is considered the oldest gliding club in Australia.

The club operated from Essendon Airport and Coode Island during the 1930s, but following a search for permanent grounds, moved to Benalla Airport in 1953.

The first glider owned by the club was a Zoegling named The Falcon, which was launched in August 1930.

During the 1940s, the Gliding Club of Victoria petitioned The Aero Club Federation of Australia for certification of their pilots. This finally occurred in 1947 and Leo Bernard Dowling was awarded the first glider pilot certificate in Australia.

By 1991, the club owned 18 gliders, had more than 300 active pilots, and approximately 550 members.

The club hosted the World Gliding Championships at Benalla in 1987 and 2017.

== Notable members ==
- Vivienne Drew, who served as club president (1999-2001) and vice president (1994, 1996-1998, 2002-2003), was awarded the Order of Australia Medal for services to gliding in 2024.
- Pat Bourke, the South Melbourne footballer was member number 200.
- Grace Roberts, the first female club member who began piloting gliders in 1943.
- Sir Raymond William Garrett, AFC, AE, the clubs first president.

== Gallery ==
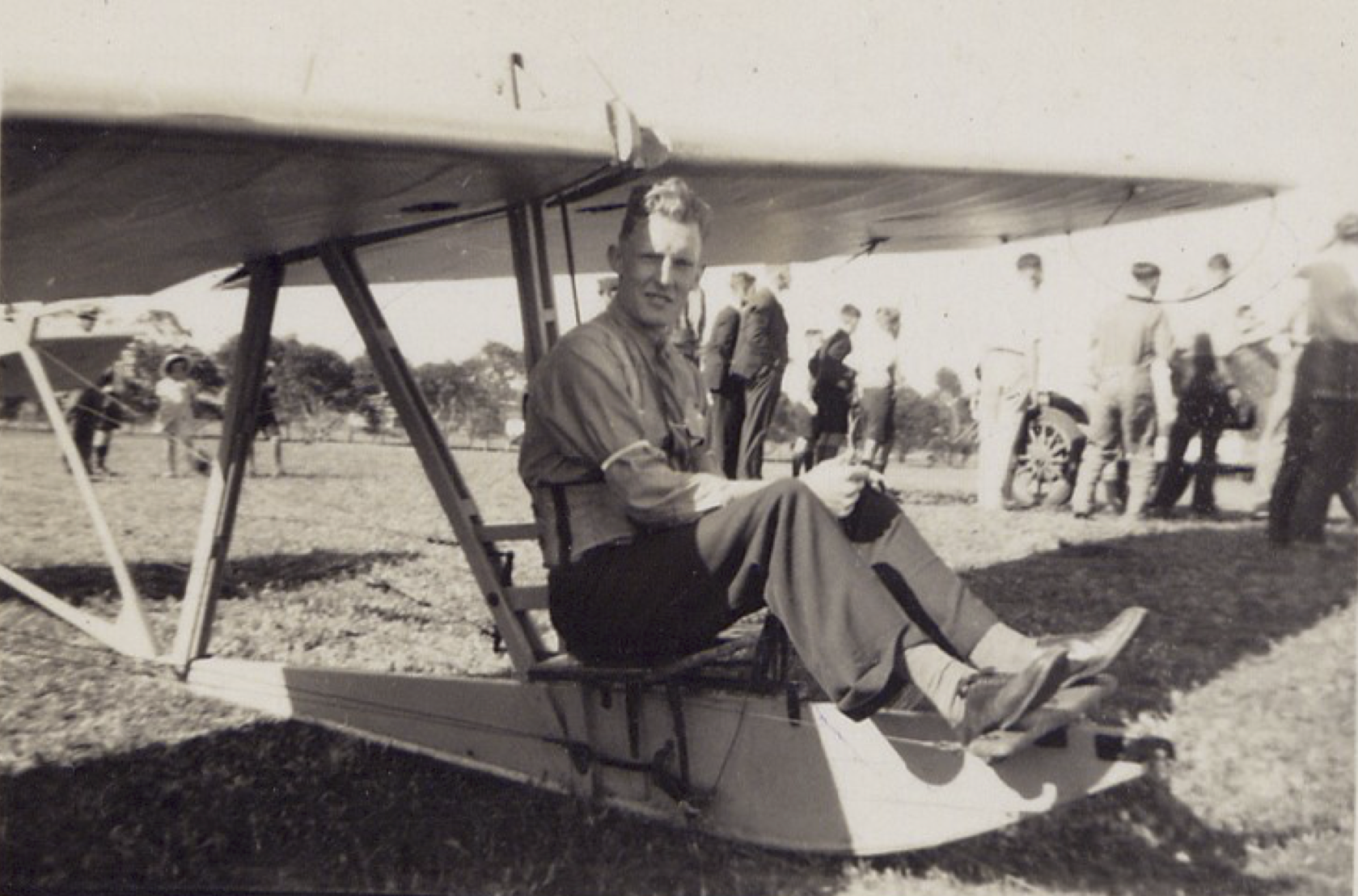
Leo Dowling in a Primary Glider at Belmont Common Victoria 13 October 1940

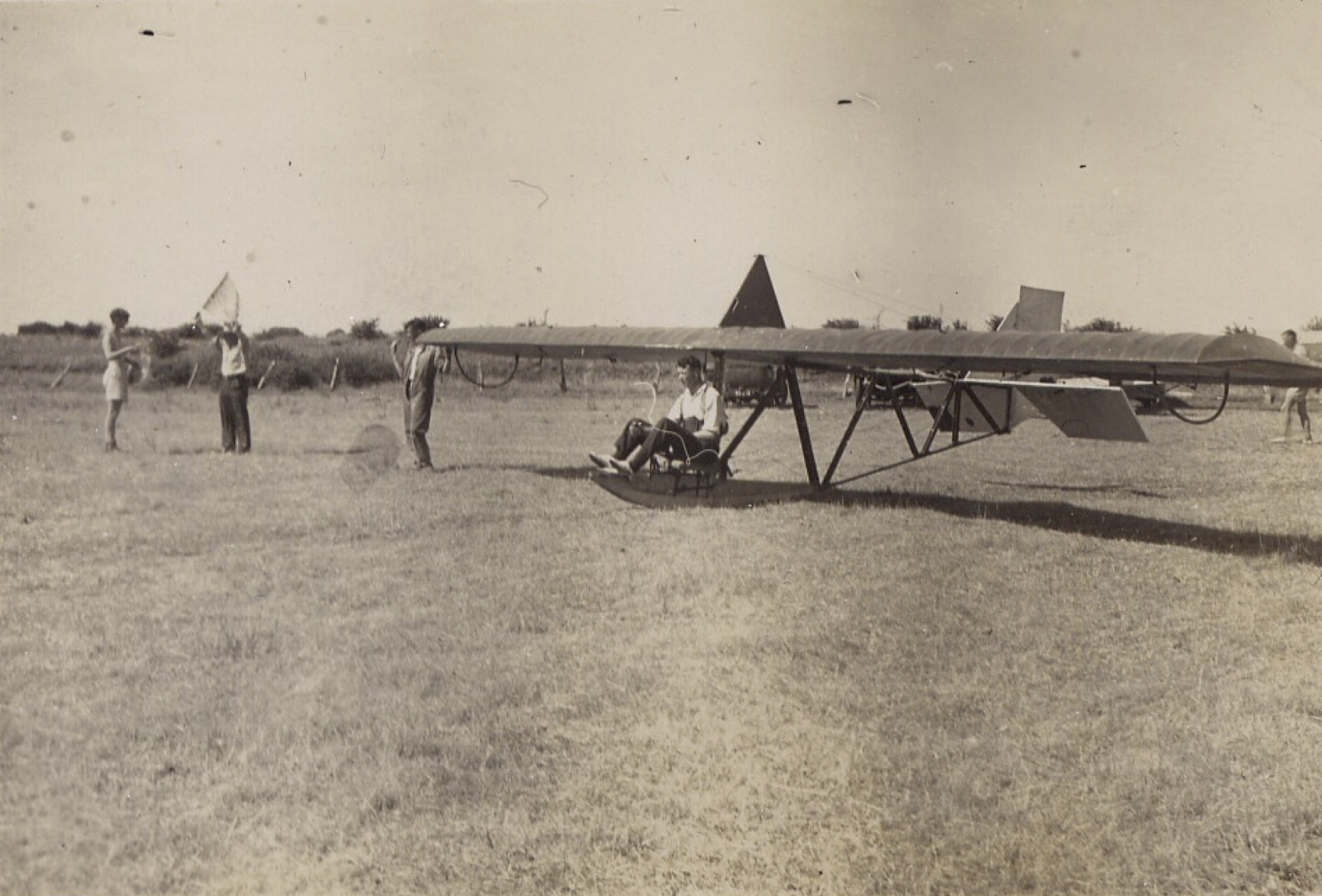
Primary Glider being launched at Mordialloc, Victoria

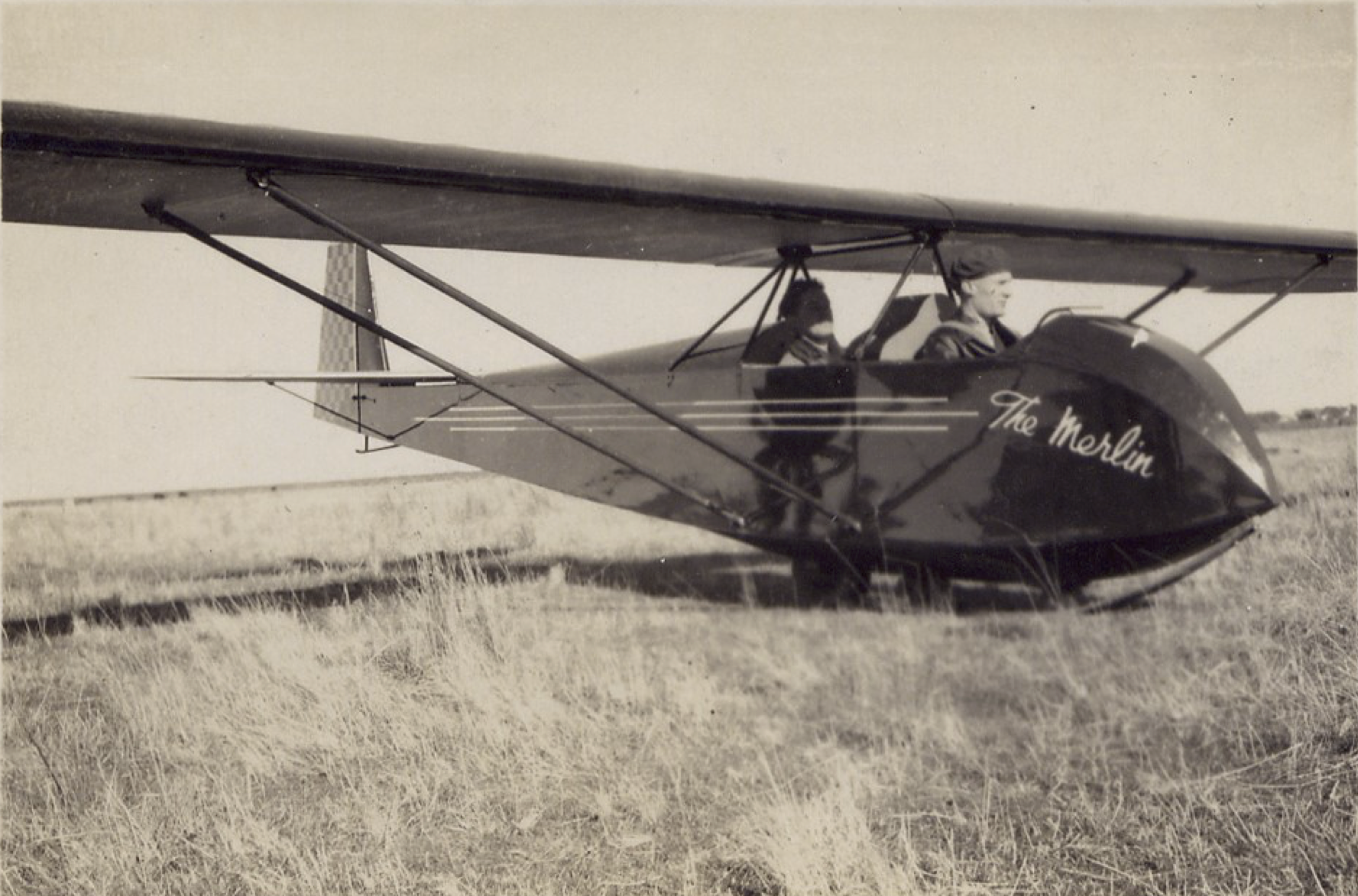
Merlin glider 1943

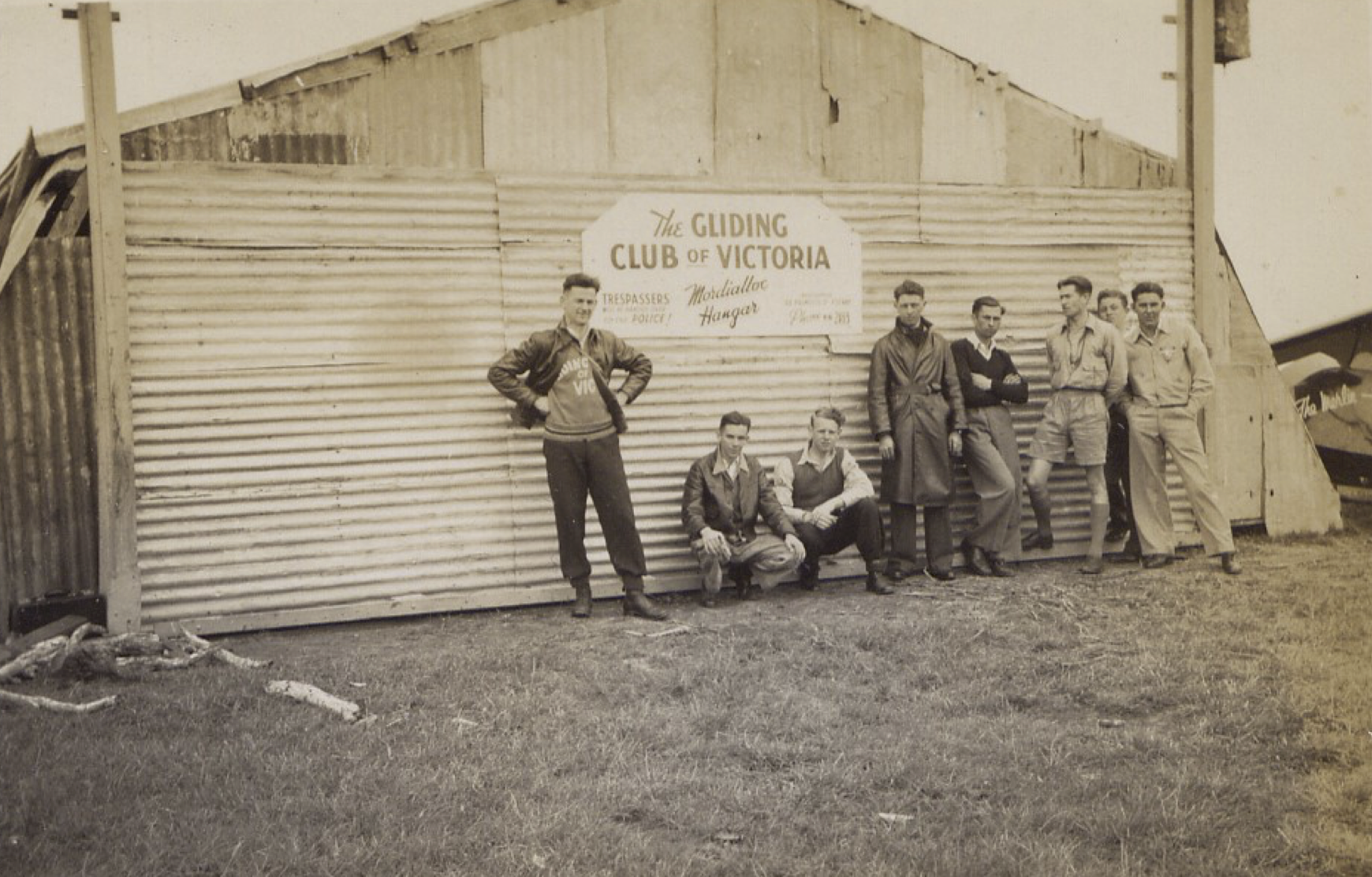
Gliding Club of Victoria c1945

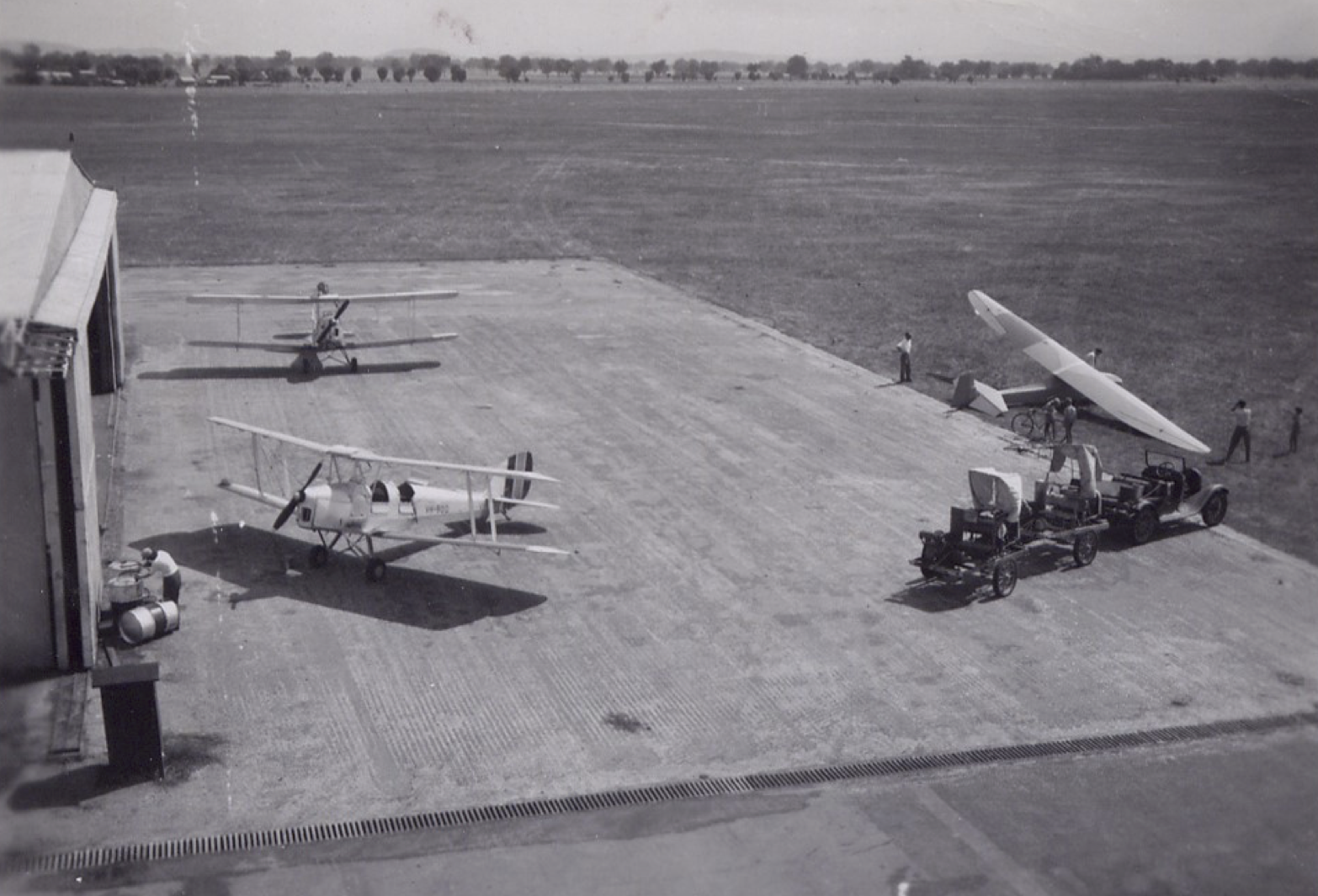
Gliding Club of Victoria Benalla 1948
