= Roy Phillipps =

Australian fighter pilot

Roy Cecil Phillipps
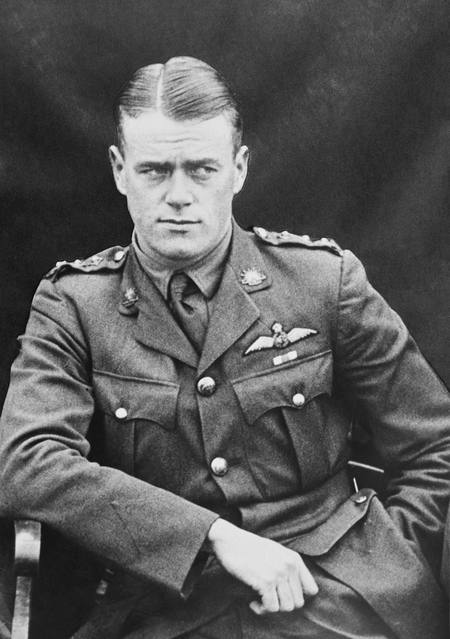
- Captain Roy Phillipps in France, March 1918
- Born: 1 March 1892; New South Wales
- Died: 21 May 1941 (aged 49); Archerfield, Queensland
- Military career
- Allegiance: Australia
- Branch: Australian Imperial Force; Royal Australian Air Force
- Service years: 1915–19; 1940–41
- Rank: Squadron Leader
- Units: 28th Battalion AIF (1915–17); No. 32 Squadron RFC (1917); No. 2 Squadron AFC (1917–18)
- Commands: No. 6 Squadron AFC (1918–19); No. 2 EFTS RAAF (1940–41)
- Conflicts: World War I; Gallipoli Campaign; Western Front; Battle of Cambrai; German spring offensive; Hundred Days Offensive; World War II
- Awards: Military Cross & Bar; Distinguished Flying Cross
- Other work: Grazier

Roy Cecil Phillipps, MC & Bar, DFC (1 March 1892 – 21 May 1941) was an Australian fighter ace of World War I. He achieved fifteen victories in aerial combat, four of them in a single action on 12 June 1918. A grazier between the wars, he joined the Royal Australian Air Force (RAAF) in 1940 and was killed in a plane crash the following year.

Born in New South Wales but raised in Western Australia, Phillipps joined the Australian Imperial Force as an infantryman in April 1915, seeing action at Gallipoli and on the Western Front. Wounded twice in 1916, he transferred to the Australian Flying Corps (AFC) and was accepted for pilot training in May 1917. As a member of No. 2 Squadron in France, Phillipps flew mainly S.E.5 fighters, and was awarded two Military Crosses and the Distinguished Flying Cross for his actions. He finished the war a major, commanding No. 6 (Training) Squadron in England. Returning to Australia in 1919, he left the AFC and was managing a rural property when he enlisted in the RAAF soon after the outbreak of World War II. At his death he was ranked squadron leader, commanding No. 2 Elementary Flying Training School at Archerfield, Queensland.

== Early life ==
Phillipps was born on 1 March 1892 in New South Wales; sources differ on the exact location, which is recorded as either rural Moree, or metropolitan North Sydney. He was the son of William Hargreaves Phillipps, originally of Northumberland, England, and his wife Cecil. After his father died, Phillipps' mother took him to live in Perth, Western Australia. Educated at Hale School, he studied to be an accountant and was practising on a pastoral property in the Kimberley when war broke out in 1914.

== World War I ==
=== 28th Battalion ===
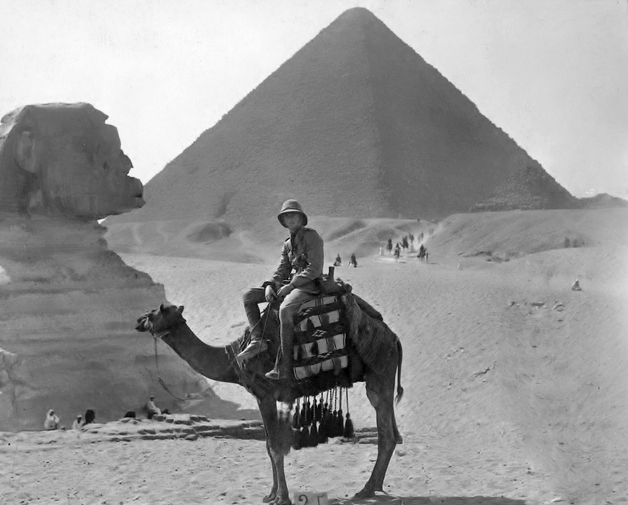
Second Lieutenant Phillipps serving with the 28th Battalion, Giza, 1915

Phillipps enlisted in the Australian Imperial Force in April 1915 and was assigned to the 28th Battalion, an infantry unit raised the same month at Blackboy Camp, Western Australia. He successfully applied for a commission and left for Egypt aboard HMAT Ascanius on 9 June as a second lieutenant. After training in Egypt, he departed with his unit for Gallipoli aboard the transport Ivernia on 4 September. He was promoted to lieutenant on 25 October. The 28th Battalion, which had been sent to Gallipoli late in the campaign as reinforcements, was not heavily engaged on the peninsula, and suffered relatively few casualties before the withdrawal in December 1915.

In March 1916, Phillipps was deployed to France with the 28th Battalion for service on the Western Front. He participated in a raid against the forts of Armentières on the night of 6/7 June, and saw action during the Battle of Pozières in July. On 5 August, he was shot through the thigh, requiring evacuation to England for hospital treatment. He was promoted to captain on 12 August. Phillipps rejoined his unit in October but suffered another gunshot wound to the thigh the following month, near Gueudecourt. He returned to England once more to recover, and remained in hospital until 2 March 1917.

=== Australian Flying Corps ===
Unable to take any further part in the war as an infantryman, Phillipps would normally have been repatriated to Australia, but instead engineered a transfer to the Australian Flying Corps (AFC) as adjutant of No. 2 Squadron. After getting a taste of flying as a passenger, the twenty-five-year-old applied for pilot training, altering his birthdate from 1892 to 1896. The official age limit for pilots in the AFC was thirty, but the preferred age was under twenty-three. Phillipps' application was accepted in May 1917 and, after qualifying for his wings, his proficiency was considered such that in August he was attached to No. 32 Squadron of the Royal Flying Corps to gain operational experience in France. Within three days of arriving he crash-landed his Airco DH.5 after it was hit by anti-aircraft fire near Ypres, but he escaped injury; by the time he completed his attachment in September he was leading combat patrols.

Phillipps married Ellen Robinson, daughter of Western Australia's Attorney-General, at St Mary Abbots in Kensington, London, on 8 September 1917. Rejoining No. 2 Squadron within the month as a flight commander, he was initially engaged mainly in low-level strafing and bombing missions in DH.5s as his unit, attached to the British Third Army, took part in the Battle of Passchendaele. During the subsequent Battle of Cambrai, on 22 November he recorded his first aerial victory when he turned the tables on a German fighter that had attacked him from above, forcing it to land. He was recommended for the Military Cross on 3 December, the award being promulgated in The London Gazette on 4 February 1918, and the full citation appearing on 5 July:

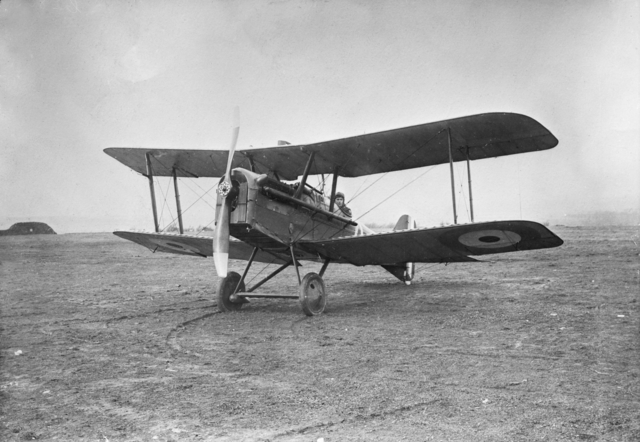
Captain Phillipps in his S.E.5 fighter, January 1918

Capt. Roy Cecil Phillipps, F.C. For conspicuous gallantry and devotion to duty. He has performed continuous gallant work at very low altitudes in almost impossible weather. Whilst flying alone in a mist he forced an enemy aeroplane to land. On two occasions, flying at an altitude of 200 feet, he made very valuable reconnaissances, and his reports on the general situation were of the greatest value. His leadership is excellent, and he has set a high example to his flight.

No. 2 Squadron converted to Royal Aircraft Factory S.E.5s in January 1918. The unit generally conducted patrols with flights of six aircraft but found it difficult to lure enemy fighters into combat, so after a lull in fighting early in February it began flying two-plane missions, which yielded better results. The following month, as the German spring offensive got under way, Phillipps shot down three German fighters in as many days: a Fokker Triplane on 22 March, an Albatros the next morning, and a two-seater on 24 March; the official history of Australia in the war recorded that the last-mentioned enemy lost its wings to Phillipps' machine-gun fire, and "fell like a stone"; with the Allies holding clear superiority over the German fighters, the main danger to the Australians was from ground fire as most combat took place at low level, and "their machines came back full of bullet-holes". On 27 March, Phillipps achieved two more victories, a Triplane that he sent down in flames near Albert and another German fighter over Méaulte. He was recommended for a bar to his Military Cross on 31 March, and the award was gazetted on 22 June:

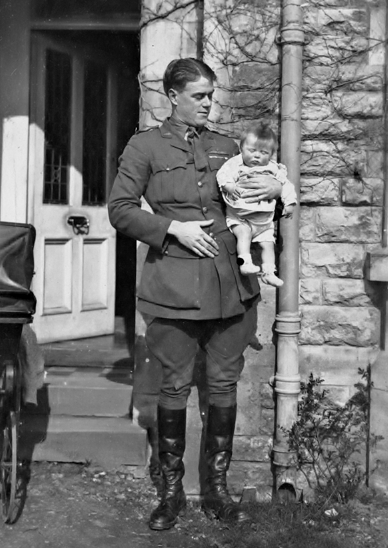
Major Phillipps with his daughter Helen in England, c. 1918

Capt. Roy Cecil Phillipps, M.C., Aust. F.C. attd. R.F.C. For conspicuous gallantry and devotion to duty. When engaged with hostile aircraft during the recent operations, he has destroyed three enemy machines, and has in addition brought down two hostile planes out of control. He has also brought back accurate and valuable information regarding hostile movements under the most adverse conditions, particularly on one occasion, when he flew through a heavy barrage at a low altitude behind the enemy's lines. He has shown conspicuous skill and determination when escorting low-flying bombing patrols.

During April 1918, No. 2 Squadron began operating in wide-ranging offensive "circus" patrols made up of large formations of fighters, often drawn from several squadrons. Phillipps destroyed a Pfalz near Bapaume on 16 May, before achieving his greatest success on 12 June when he shot down four German fighters in a single patrol over Ribécourt. His victims included two Fokker Triplanes, one of which he attacked head-on, an LVG, and a Fokker D.VII flown by Fritz Loerzer, commander of Jasta 26 and an eleven-victory ace, who was captured. The feat also gave Phillipps a total of eleven victories, making him the equal highest-scoring ace in No. 2 Squadron along with Captain Henry Forrest. Phillipps was recommended for the Distinguished Flying Cross on 16 June, and the award was promulgated on 3 August:

Capt. Roy Cecil Phillipps, M.C. (Australian Flying Corps). Whilst on offensive patrol this officer destroyed personally four enemy aeroplanes; he has also shown the greatest gallantry during the recent operations in attacking troops and transports on the roads, and dropping bombs from very low altitudes.

On 25 July, Phillipps was leading the escort for a raid on the Lille forts east of Armentières when he spotted a patrol of seven Fokkers. Jettisoning his bombs to lighten his load, he attacked one of the German fighters and shot away its wing; the others retreated. During the Allies' Hundred Days Offensive, on 12 August, he joined fellow No. 2 Squadron ace Adrian Cole and No. 4 Squadron aces Harry Cobby and Roy King to lead their combined forces in support of the British Fourth Army, Phillipps accounting for a Fokker that broke up in mid-air. He was credited with two other victories in August to bring his tally to fifteen, making him No. 2 Squadron's second most successful ace after Captain Francis Smith, who finished the war with sixteen. Later that month, Phillipps rotated back to England in accordance with Royal Air Force policy, which required pilots to be rested and serve as instructors after nine to twelve months in combat. In October, he was promoted to major and posted to command No. 6 (Training) Squadron at Minchinhampton; the unit was primarily responsible for training new pilots for service with No. 2 Squadron.

== Interwar years and World War II ==
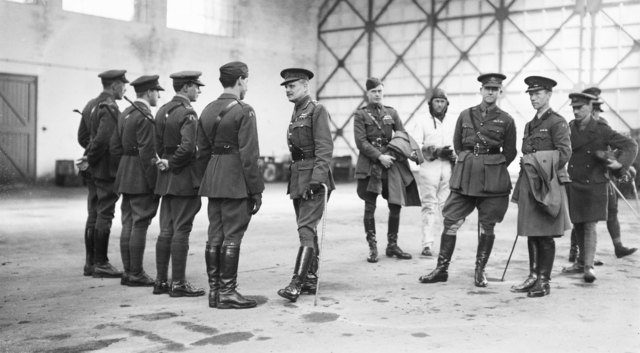
General Sir William Birdwood (fifth from left) with (left to right behind Birdwood) Major Phillipps, Captain Les Holden (in flying suit), Lt Col. Oswald Watt, Lt Col. Horace Clowes Brinsmead and Major R. S. Brown at Aston Down airfield, March 1919

Phillipps relinquished command of No. 6 Squadron upon its disbandment in March 1919. He returned to Australia on 16 June aboard the troopship Kaiser-i-Hind, and was discharged from the Australian Flying Corps on 15 August. That month he was one of several veteran pilots, including Lieutenant Colonel Oswald Watt and Major Bill Anderson, appointed to serve on a committee examining applications for a proposed Australian air service to replace the AFC; the Australian Air Corps, immediate precursor to the Royal Australian Air Force (RAAF), was duly formed on 1 January 1920 under Anderson's command.

After leaving the military, Phillipps became a grazier in New South Wales. He purchased Courallie station at Moree in 1926, and was managing the property when Australia declared war in September 1939. In February 1940, he enlisted in the RAAF as a flying officer. Raised to flight lieutenant, he was posted as assistant chief ground instructor to No. 2 Elementary Flying Training School (No. 2 EFTS) at Archerfield, Queensland, on 27 March. No. 2 EFTS was one of twelve basic flying schools established by the RAAF as part of Australia's contribution to the Empire Air Training Scheme. Phillipps was appointed chief ground instructor on 17 June. Having been promoted to squadron leader, he assumed command of No. 2 EFTS on 20 October 1940.

Phillipps died on 21 May 1941, following an accident in a private plane. The aircraft, piloted by its owner, Flight Lieutenant J. W. F. Collins, was reported to have taken off from Archerfield at night without RAAF or Civil Aviation Department clearance, and collided with trees. Survived by his wife, son and three daughters, Phillipps was cremated at Mount Thompson Crematorium in Brisbane. He is commemorated on the Queensland Cremation Memorial, Brisbane, and on panel 116 of the Australian War Memorial, Canberra.
