= Killimster =

Hamlet in caithness, Scotland

Coordinates: 58.49473°N 3.17248°W

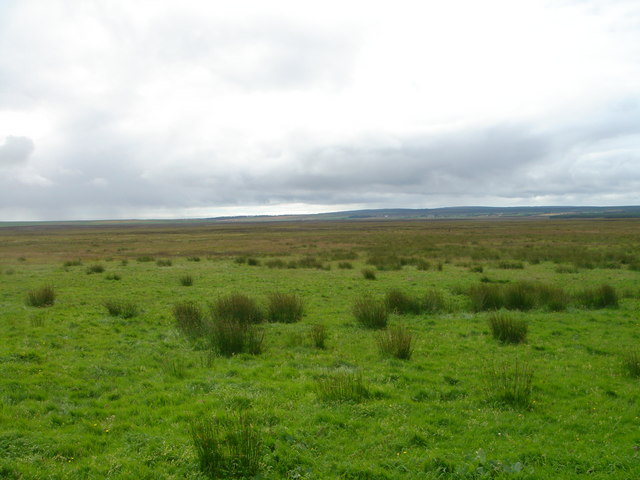
- Moss of Killimster

- Location within the Caithness area
- OS grid reference: ND317568
- Council area: Highland
- Country: Scotland
- Sovereign state: United Kingdom
- Post town: Wick
- Postcode district: KW1 4
- Police: Scotland
- Fire: Scottish
- Ambulance: Scottish

Killimster is a hamlet 8 kilometres (5 mi) north-west of Wick, in eastern Caithness, Scottish Highlands and is in the Scottish council area of Highland. RAF Skitten, the departure point for Operation Freshman in World War II, was located at Killimster. Nearby is Loch of Killimster, a small loch (lochan) which is 3.7 metres (12 ft) deep, covers an area of 10 hectares (25 acres) and holds around 379,000 cubic metres (13,400,000 cu ft) of water.
