= No. 11 Elementary Flying Training School RAAF =

Royal Australian Air Force pilot-training unit from World War II

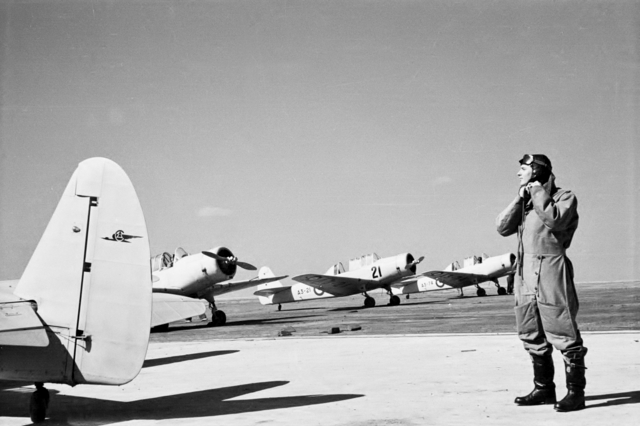
- Student pilot preparing to board a Wackett Trainer at No. 11 Elementary Flying Training School in Benalla, Victoria, c. 1942
- Active: 1941–46
- Country: Australia
- Branch: Royal Australian Air Force
- Role: Introductory flying training
- Part of: Southern Area Command
- Garrison/HQ: Benalla, Victoria
- Engagements: World War II

Aircraft flown
- Trainer: Tiger Moth; Wackett Trainer

No. 11 Elementary Flying Training School (No. 11 EFTS) was a Royal Australian Air Force (RAAF) pilot training unit that operated during World War II. It was one of twelve elementary flying training schools employed by the RAAF to provide introductory flight instruction to new pilots as part of Australia's contribution to the Empire Air Training Scheme. No. 11 EFTS was established in June 1941 at Benalla, Victoria, and operated Tiger Moths and Wackett Trainers during the war. It ceased training in July 1945 after almost 3,000 students had passed through and was re-formed as Care and Maintenance Unit (CMU) Benalla in February 1946. CMU Benalla was disbanded in October 1948.

== History ==
Flying instruction in the Royal Australian Air Force (RAAF) underwent major changes following the outbreak of World War II, in response to a vast increase in the number of aircrew volunteers and the commencement of Australia's participation in the Empire Air Training Scheme (EATS). The Air Force's pre-war pilot training facility, No. 1 Flying Training School at RAAF Station Point Cook, Victoria, was supplanted in 1940–41 by twelve elementary flying training schools (EFTS) and eight service flying training schools (SFTS). The EFTS provided a twelve-week introductory flying course to personnel who had graduated from one of the RAAF's initial training schools. Flying training was undertaken in two stages: the first involved four weeks of instruction (including ten hours of flying) to determine trainees' suitability to become pilots. Those that passed this grading process then received a further eight weeks of training (including sixty-five hours of flying) at the EFTS. Pilots who successfully completed this course were posted to an SFTS in either Australia or Canada for the next stage of their instruction as military aviators.

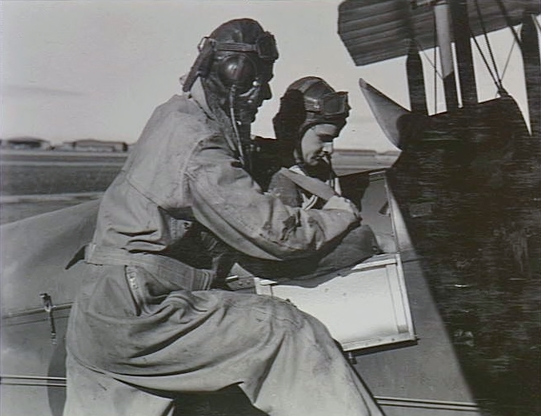
Instructor and trainee of No. 11 EFTS, c. 1944

No. 11 Elementary Flying Training School (No. 11 EFTS) was formed at Benalla, Victoria, on 26 June 1941, and came under the control of Southern Area Command. Its inaugural commanding officer was Squadron Leader I.C.C. Thomson. Before being taken over by the RAAF, Benalla was an emergency runway for civil aircraft on the journey between Sydney and Melbourne. No. 11 EFTS's infrastructure, which included medical facilities and two satellite airstrips, had been budgeted at some £85,000, primarily for buildings and engineering works. When the school opened, however, only stores depots and living quarters for the 100-odd staff were completed; instructional courses, which commenced on 24 July, were initially held in tents near the main airstrip. No hangars were constructed for the de Havilland Tiger Moth training aircraft until towards the end of the year.

Flying at Benalla was hampered by bad weather, and the runway was unusable from September to November 1941, necessitating the detachment of over 250 personnel to Essendon, home of No. 3 EFTS, to continue their training. In October 1941, six airmen of No. 11 EFTS were court-martialled for mutiny. Their main grievance was having to undertake guard duty at night and attend parades at 7:15 am in addition to their regular ground support work. One of the men was found guilty of incitement and the other five for failing to report their knowledge of the matter to the commanding officer. The former was sentenced to eighteen months imprisonment and the others to between five and six months detention; all were discharged from the Air Force. On 11 December 1941, one of the school's Tiger Moths made a crash landing in a field and struck four people on the ground, killing two and injuring the others; the two pilots were uninjured. The outbreak of war in the Pacific saw slit trenches being dug at the base.

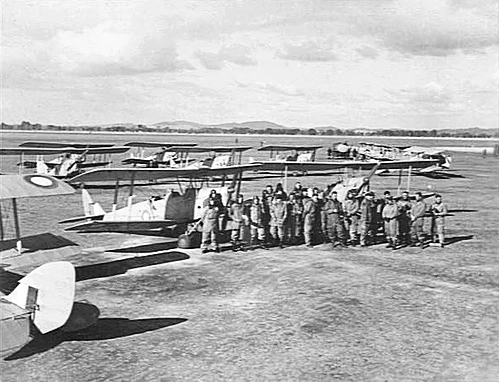
Instructors and students of No. 11 EFTS with their Tiger Moth training aircraft, c. 1944

The school began replacing its Tiger Moths with CAC Wackett Trainers in January 1942. No. 11 EFTS absorbed No. 3 EFTS's instructors, students and Wackett Trainers in April, shortly before the latter unit disbanded. The same month at Benalla, thirty-two United States Army Air Corps pilots undertook four weeks of flying in the Wacketts. On 5 September 1942, one of the Wacketts crashed after apparently stalling on takeoff, killing the trainee and seriously injuring the pilot. The Wackett Trainers were taken out of service for upgrades in February 1943, and the school again began operating Tiger Moths. One pilot was killed and another seriously injured when their Tiger Moths collided shortly after takeoff on 15 June. On 7 July, one of the Tiger Moths crashed during a night-flying exercise just east of Benalla, killing both pilots. Another Tiger Moth and its pilot were lost in a crash west of Benalla on 20 October 1943. On 14 May 1944, a pilot was killed and a trainee seriously injured when their Tiger Moth spun out of control during an instrument test north of Benalla.

Flying training at No. 11 EFTS had largely wound down by May 1945. Ten students from the Netherlands East Indies underwent courses in June, and in July all instruction stopped, by which time 2,953 trainees had attended the school. No. 11 EFTS's facilities were used to establish Care and Maintenance Unit (CMU) Benalla on 28 February 1946. It was one of many CMUs that the RAAF raised after the war for the storage and upkeep of surplus aircraft prior to their disposal. CMU Benalla was responsible for maintaining North American P-51 Mustangs. It transferred all its aircraft to CMU Tocumwal, New South Wales, on 15 October 1948, and disbanded the same day.

A memorial to No. 11 EFTS was dedicated at Benalla on 17 June 1995.
