= RAAF Station Parkes =

RAAF Station Parkes was a Royal Australian Air Force (RAAF) station located at Parkes, New South Wales, Australia. Formed in 1941 as part of the Empire Air Training Scheme as a training station during the Second World War. After the conclusion of hostilities, the training units ceased to operate from the station. No. 87 Squadron briefly operated from the airfield at the station from October 1945 until it was disbanded on 24 July 1946. The station closed in 1946.

== Units based at RAAF Station Parkes ==
- No. 1 Air Navigation School (1941–1945)
- No. 2 Wireless Air Gunners School (1941–1945)
- No. 8 Operational Training Unit RAAF (1944–1945)
- Central Flying School RAAF (19 February 1944 – 18 September 1944)
- No. 87 Squadron RAAF (October 1945 – 24 July 1946)
