= Camden Museum of Aviation =

Museum in New South Wales, Australia

- Location: Harrington Park
- Coordinates: 34°02′14″S 150°44′19″E

The Camden Museum of Aviation is a private museum located in Harrington Park, New South Wales. Its collection includes 18 aircraft. It was founded at Camden Airport in 1967 and moved to its current location in 1976.

== History ==
The museum was the idea of Harold Thomas, who had been an apprentice at Australian National Airways, an airline operated by Charles Kingsford Smith. Thomas collected aero engines and, in 1961, obtained his first complete aircraft. The Department of Civil Aviation approved Thomas commencing a museum and, in 1963, he acquired his first hangar space at Camden Airport.

The museum aims to recondition military aircraft to taxiable standard. Using service records and photographs for research, aircraft from the Royal Australian Air Force, Australian Army Aviation and the Royal Australian Navy's Fleet Air Arm, are restored with faithful wartime markings, camouflage and cockpit instruments. In 1968 and 1970, the museum helped to prepare items for display at the Australian War Memorial and a temporary exhibition at the Wynyard branch of the Bank of New South Wales.

Since 2008, the museum has not been open to the public and has operated as a private organisation, run by a group of volunteers who maintain and restore the Thomas Aviation Collection. The Museum's website states that "there are no plans to re-open to the general public at the current site".
