= RAF Skitten =

Former Royal Air Force station in Caithness, Scotland

RAF Skitten
- Killimster, Caithness in Scotland

Site information
- Type: Royal Air Force Satellite Station
- Code: NS
- Owner: Air Ministry
- Operator: Royal Air Force
- Controlled by: RAF Fighter Command 1940-41; RAF Coastal Command 1941-45

Location
- Shown within Caithness RAF Skitten (the United Kingdom)
- Coordinates: 58°29′45″N 003°09′50″W

Site history
- Built: 1940
- In use: December 1940 - May 1945
- Battles/wars: European theatre of World War II

Airfield information
- Elevation: 20 metres (66 ft) AMSL
Runways
Direction	Length and surface
00/00	Tarmac
00/00	Tarmac
00/00	Tarmac

Royal Air Force Skitten or more simply RAF Skitten is a former Royal Air Force satellite station directly east of the village of Killimster, located 5.1 miles (8.2 km) north east of Watten, Caithness, Scotland, and 4.7 miles (7.6 km) northwest of Wick, Caithness, Scotland. On 19 November 1942, Operation Freshman departed from RAF Skitten.

== History ==
Squadrons

- No. 48 Squadron RAF
- No. 86 Squadron RAF
- No. 144 Squadron RAF
- No. 172 Squadron RAF
- No. 179 Squadron RAF
- No. 217 Squadron RAF
- No. 232 Squadron RAF
- No. 260 Squadron RAF
- No. 404 Squadron RCAF (1941)
- No. 407 Squadron RCAF (1943)
- No. 489 Squadron RNZAF
- No. 519 Squadron RAF
- No. 607 (County of Durham) Squadron AAF
- No. 608 (North Riding) Squadron AAF
- No. 612 (County of Aberdeen) Squadron AAF
- No. 618 Squadron RAF
- 804 Naval Air Squadron

Units

- No. 1693 (General Reconnaissance) Flight (September - December 1943)
- No. 2709 Squadron RAF Regiment
- No. 2716 Squadron RAF Regiment
- No. 4010 Anti-Aircraft Flight RAF Regiment

== Current use ==
The site is now used for quarrying and as farmland.

== See also ==
- List of former Royal Air Force stations
