= Benalla Airport =

Australian Airport

- IATA: BLN; ICAO: YBLA

Summary
- Airport type: Public
- Operator: Benalla Rural City Council
- Location: Benalla, Victoria
- Elevation AMSL: 569 ft / 173 m
- Coordinates: 36°33′06″S 146°00′24″E

Map
- Location in Victoria

Runways
Direction	Length		Surface
Direction	m	ft	Surface
08R/26L	1,043	3,422	Bitumen
08L/26R	1,043	3,422	Grass
17R/35L	718	2,356	Grass
17L/35R	718	2,356	Grass
- Sources: Australian AIP and aerodrome chart

Benalla Airport (IATA: BLN, ICAO: YBLA) is located 1 km east of Benalla, Victoria, Australia. Benalla Airport is the home of the Gliding Club of Victoria.

The airport was opened in 1941, as one of the many training bases in southern Australia supporting the commitment of the Royal Australian Air Force (RAAF) to the Empire Air Training Scheme, and the No. 11 Elementary Flying School was based there between 1941 and 1945.

The World Gliding Championship was held at the Airport in 1987 and 2017.

== See also ==
- List of airports in Victoria, Australia
