= RAAF Station Narromine =

RAAF Station Narromine was a Royal Australian Air Force (RAAF) station located at Narromine, New South Wales, Australia. Narromine Airfield was requisitioned in July 1940 as part of the Empire Air Training Scheme during the Second World War.

No. 5 Elementary Flying Training School (5EFTS) operated from 1940 to 1944. The EFTS gave a recruit 50 hours of basic aviation instruction on a simple trainer such as a Tiger Moth. Pilots who showed promise went on to advanced training at a Service Flying Training School. Others went on to different specialties, such as Wireless Schools, Air Observer Schools or Bombing and Gunnery Schools.

No. 8 Operational Training Unit (8OTU) also operated from Narromine between 1942 until 1944, when it was transferred to RAAF Station Parkes. No. 618 Squadron RAF arrived at Narromine in February 1945 equipped with de Havilland Mosquito Mk.VI aircraft for anti-shipping attacks in the Pacific area of operations, however was disbanded on 14 July 1945.

== Units based at RAAF Station Narromine ==
- No 5 Elementary Flying Training School (1940–1944)
- No. 8 Operational Training Unit RAAF (1942–1944)
- No. 618 Squadron RAF (February 1945 – 14 July 1945)
- No. 93 Squadron RAAF (23 December 1945 – 22 August 1946)
