= Adrian Cole (RAAF officer) =

Royal Australian Air Force senior commander

Adrian Lindley Trevor Cole
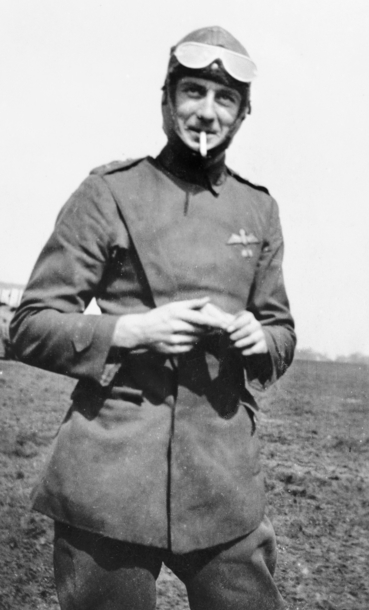
- Lieutenant Adrian Cole in Palestine, 1917
- Born: 19 June 1895; Glen Iris, Victoria
- Died: 14 February 1966 (aged 70); Melbourne, Victoria
- Military career
- Allegiance: Australia
- Service/branch: Royal Australian Air Force
- Service years: 1914–46
- Rank: Air Vice Marshal
- Nickname: "King"
- Units: No. 1 Squadron AFC (1916–17); No. 2 Squadron AFC (1917–18)
- Commands: RAAF Station Laverton (1929–32); RAAF Station Richmond (1936–38); No. 2 Group (1939–40); Southern Area Command (1940–41); RAF Northern Ireland (1942–43); North-Western Area Command (1943–44)
- Conflicts: World War I; Middle Eastern theatre; Sinai and Palestine campaign; Western Front; World War II; Middle Eastern theatre; European theatre; Dieppe Raid; South West Pacific theatre; North Western Area campaign; New Guinea campaign; Operation Transom; South East Asian theatre
- Awards: Commander of the Order of the British Empire; Distinguished Service Order; Military Cross; Distinguished Flying Cross
- Other work: Company director

Air Vice Marshal Adrian Lindley Trevor Cole, CBE, DSO, MC, DFC (19 June 1895 – 14 February 1966) was a senior commander in the Royal Australian Air Force (RAAF). Joining the army at the outbreak of World War I, he transferred to the Australian Flying Corps in 1916 and flew with No. 1 Squadron in the Middle East and No. 2 Squadron on the Western Front. He became an ace, credited with victories over ten enemy aircraft, and earned the Military Cross and the Distinguished Flying Cross. In 1921, he was a founding member of the RAAF.

"King" Cole rose to the position of Air Member for Supply in 1933 and gained promotion to group captain in 1935. The following year he was appointed the first commanding officer of Headquarters RAAF Station Richmond. During World War II, he led North-Western Area Command in Darwin, Northern Territory, and held a series of overseas posts in North Africa, England, Northern Ireland, and Ceylon. As Forward Air Controller during the Dieppe Raid in 1942, he was wounded in action and awarded the Distinguished Service Order. Cole served on corporate boards of directors following his retirement from the RAAF in 1946. He died in 1966 at the age of seventy.

== Early life and World War I ==
Adrian Cole was born in Glen Iris, a suburb of Melbourne, to barrister and doctor Robert Cole and his wife Helen (née Hake). He was educated at Geelong Grammar School and Melbourne Grammar School, where he was a member of the cadet corps. When World War I broke out in August 1914, Cole gained a commission in the Australian Military Forces, serving with the 55th (Collingwood) Infantry Regiment. He resigned his commission to join the Australian Imperial Force on 28 January 1916, intending to become a pilot in the Australian Flying Corps.

=== Middle East ===
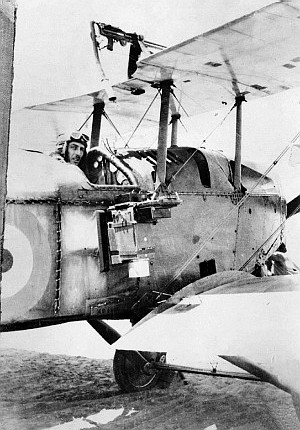
Lieutenant Cole in a No. 1 Squadron Martinsyde "Elephant" for photographic reconnaissance, Palestine, 1917

Posted to No. 1 Squadron (also known until 1918 as No. 67 Squadron, Royal Flying Corps), Cole departed Melbourne aboard HMAT A67 Orsova on 16 March 1916, bound for Egypt. He was commissioned a second lieutenant in June and began his pilot training in August. By the beginning of 1917, he was flying reconnaissance and scouting missions in Sinai and Palestine. He took part in an early example of Allied air-sea cooperation on 25 February, directing French naval fire against the coastal town of Jaffa by radio from his B.E.2 biplane. On 20 April, Cole and fellow squadron member Lieutenant Roy Maxwell Drummond attacked six enemy aircraft that were threatening to bomb Allied cavalry, scattering their formation and chasing them back to their own lines. Both airmen were awarded the Military Cross for their actions; Cole's citation was published in a supplement to the London Gazette on 16 August 1917:

For conspicuous gallantry and devotion to duty. With another officer he attacked and disorganised six enemy machines that were about to attack our cavalry with bombs. The engagement was continued until all six machines were forced to return to their lines. His skill and courage on all occasions have been worthy of the greatest praise.

The day after the action that earned him the Military Cross, Cole was flying a Martinsyde G.100 "Elephant" over Tel el Sheria when he was hit by ground fire and forced to crash land behind enemy lines; after setting his aircraft alight he was picked up and rescued by Captain Richard Williams. On 26 June, following an eight-plane raid on Turkish Fourth Army headquarters in Jerusalem, Cole and another pilot suffered engine seizures while undertaking a similar rescue of a downed comrade; all three airmen were forced to walk through no man's land before being picked up by an Australian Light Horse patrol.

=== Western Front ===
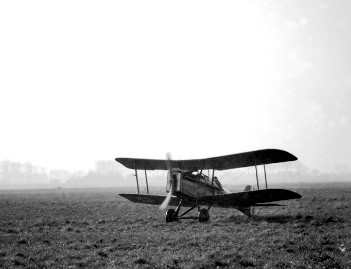
Cole in a No. 2 Squadron S.E.5, Lille, November 1918

Promoted to captain in August 1917, Cole was posted to France as a flight commander with No. 2 Squadron AFC (also known until 1918 as No. 68 Squadron RFC). Flying S.E.5 fighters on the Western Front, he was credited with destroying or sending out of control ten enemy aircraft between July and October 1918, making him an ace. In a single sortie over the Lys Valley on 19 August, Cole shot down two German fighters and narrowly avoided being shot down himself immediately afterwards, when he was attacked by five Fokker Triplanes that were being pursued by Allied Bristol Fighters. On 24 September, he led into battle a patrol of fifteen S.E.5s that destroyed or damaged eight German fighters over Haubourdin and Pérenchies, claiming one Pfalz D.III for himself.

Cole was awarded the Distinguished Flying Cross for his actions on 7 October 1918, when he led No. 2 Squadron through "a tornado of anti-aircraft fire" in a major assault on transport infrastructure in Lille. During the raid he successfully bombed a goods engine and a troop train, and put several anti-aircraft batteries out of action, before leading his formation back to base at low level. The announcement and accompanying citation for his decoration was gazetted on 8 February 1919:

On 7th October this officer carried out a most successful flying raid on enemy railway lines and stations. The success of the attack was largely owing to his cool and determined leadership, and our freedom from casualties was mainly due to the methodical manner in which he collected and reorganised the machines after the raid. He himself displayed marked initiative and courage in attacking troops and other objectives. Since May Capt. Cole has destroyed four hostile machines.

== Between the wars ==
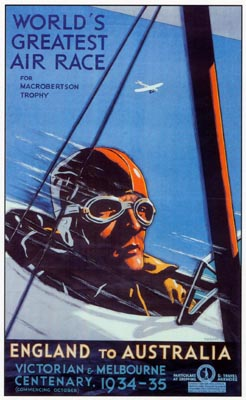
Cole deputy chaired the 1934 MacRobertson Air Race

Returning to Australia in February 1919, Cole briefly spent time as a civilian before accepting a commission in the Australian Air Corps, the short-lived successor to the Australian Flying Corps, in January 1920. On 17 June, accompanied by Captain Hippolyte De La Rue, he flew a DH.9 to a height of 27,000 feet (8,200 m), setting an Australian altitude record that stood for more than ten years. He transferred to the Royal Australian Air Force as a flight lieutenant in March 1921, becoming one of its original twenty-one officers. On 30 November, he married his cousin Katherine Cole in St Peter's Chapel at Melbourne Grammar School; the couple had two sons and two daughters. Squadron Leader Cole was posted to England in 1923–24 to attend RAF Staff College, Andover, returning to Australia in 1925 to become Director of Personnel and Training. Promoted to wing commander, he was in charge of No. 1 Flying Training School (No. 1 FTS) at RAAF Station Point Cook, Victoria, from 1926 to 1929. The first Citizens Air Force (reserve) pilots' course took place during Cole's tenure at No. 1 FTS; although twenty-four accidents occurred, injuries were minor, leading him to remark at the graduation ceremony that the students were either made of India rubber or had learned how to crash "moderately safely".

Cole held command of RAAF Station Laverton from 1929 until his appointment as Air Member for Supply (AMS) in January 1933. The AMS occupied a seat on the Air Board, which was chaired by the Chief of the Air Staff and was collectively responsible for control and administration of the RAAF. In March 1932, Cole accepted an invitation from the Lord Mayor of Melbourne to serve as Deputy Chairman of the 1934 MacRobertson Air Race from England to Australia, to celebrate Melbourne's Centenary. Provision of the RAAF's radio facilities and technicians was considered a boon for contestants, though Cole later recorded that his role involved "twenty months' hard work, without pay ... with loads of scurrilous and other criticism". Promoted to group captain in January 1935, he became the inaugural commanding officer (CO) of Headquarters RAAF Station Richmond, New South Wales, on 20 April 1936. The new headquarters, which had been formed from elements of two of the base's lodger units, No. 3 Squadron and No. 2 Aircraft Depot, supplanted an earlier arrangement where the CO of No. 3 Squadron had doubled as the station commander. Cole was appointed a Commander of the Order of the British Empire in the Coronation Honours of 11 May 1937, and attended the Imperial Defence College in London the following year. He returned to RAAF Station Laverton as CO in February 1939, taking over from Group Captain Henry Wrigley.

== World War II ==
As part of the RAAF's reorganisation following the outbreak of World War II in September 1939, No. 2 Group was formed in Sydney on 20 November, with Cole in command. The group controlled Air Force units in New South Wales. Cole was raised to temporary air commodore in December, and took charge of Central Area Command, which supplanted No. 2 Group, when it was established in the new year. In September 1941, he was sent to North Africa as Officer Commanding No. 235 Wing RAF of the Desert Air Force, where he helped establish a new anti-submarine warfare unit, No. 459 Squadron RAAF. Posted to England with Headquarters No. 11 Group in May 1942, he served as Forward Air Controller of the Dieppe Raid on 19 August, responsible for co-ordinating Allied air cover off the French coast aboard HMS Calpe. In doing so, he was seriously wounded in the jaw and upper body when German fighters strafed the ship; he required plastic surgery and spent several weeks recuperating. His gallantry during the action earned him the Distinguished Service Order, the announcement being published in a supplement to the London Gazette on 2 October 1942. The same month, he was made Air Officer Commanding (AOC) RAF Northern Ireland, with the acting rank of air vice marshal, though the command was described in the official history of Australia in the war as a "backwater".

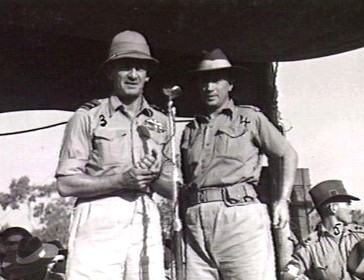
Air Vice Marshal Cole (left) as Air Officer Commanding North-Western Area at Adelaide River, Northern Territory, September 1943

In May 1943, Cole returned to Australia, taking over as AOC North-Western Area Command from Air Commodore Frank Bladin in July. Based in Darwin, Northern Territory, he was responsible for regional air defence, reconnaissance, protection of Allied shipping and, later, offensive operations in the New Guinea campaign. Cole found the command in "good shape" but considered its air defence capability inadequate, recommending augmentation by long-range fighters such as the P-38 Lightning. He nevertheless had to make do with the three squadrons of Spitfires already on his strength, and the possibility of calling on the USAAF's Fifth Air Force for reinforcements as necessary. During August and September, he reduced regular reconnaissance missions to "increase bombing activity to the limit", following a request from General Douglas MacArthur to provide all available support for Allied assaults on Lae–Nadzab. North-Western Area B-24 Liberators, Hudsons, Beaufighters and Catalinas carried out raids to destroy Japanese bases and aircraft, and divert enemy forces from Allied columns. Through March and April 1944, Cole had thirteen squadrons under his control, and was supporting amphibious operations against Hollandia and Aitape. In May, he directed bombing from North-Western Area on Surabaya as part of Operation Transom.

Cole handed over North-Western Area to Air Commodore Alan Charlesworth in September 1944. He took up an appointment as Air Member for Personnel (AMP) in October, but was removed soon afterwards following an incident at RAAF Headquarters, Melbourne. The Chief of the Air Staff, Air Vice Marshal George Jones, received an anonymous letter alleging that Cole had become drunk and lost control at a mess meeting on 8 November. Investigating the matter, Jones was unable to establish whether or not Cole had been drunk but was satisfied that he had not behaved appropriately, and issued him a warning without charging or otherwise disciplining him. Under pressure from the Federal government, Jones dismissed Cole from the position of AMP and posted him to Ceylon in January 1945 as RAAF Liaison Officer to South East Asia Command. Cole served in this role until the end of the war, taking part in negotiations for the Japanese capitulation and acting as Australia's senior representative at the formal surrender ceremony in Singapore on 12 September 1945.

== Retirement and legacy ==
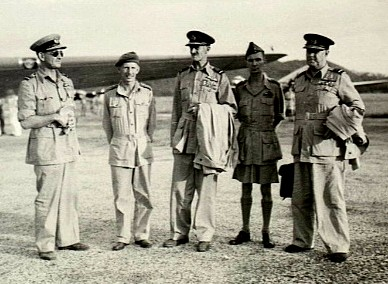
Cole (far left) as RAAF Liaison Officer to South East Asia Command, with Air Chief Marshal Sir Keith Park (centre) and Air Marshal Sir Hugh Saunders (far right), near Penang, c. August 1945

Cole was summarily retired from the RAAF in 1946, along with several other senior commanders and veterans of World War I, primarily to make way for the advancement of younger and equally capable officers. In an earlier minute to the Minister for Air, Arthur Drakeford, regarding post-war command prospects, Air Vice Marshal Jones had assessed Cole as having failed to display "certain of those qualities expected to be possessed by senior officers of such rank". In any case, his role overseas was redundant. Cole, for his part, later wrote to the Melbourne Herald that he considered the RAAF's administration during World War II to be "weak", and that as a consequence he felt "a lot happier to serve most of the War with the Royal Air Force".

Ranked substantive air commodore and honorary air vice marshal, Cole was officially discharged from the RAAF on 17 April 1946. He resented being forcibly retired, and stood for election as the Liberal Party candidate for Drakeford's seat, the Victorian Division of Maribyrnong, in the federal election that year. Cole stated that his candidacy was "an endeavour to bring some sense and stability to Government administration" but was unsuccessful, and Drakeford retained the seat. Cole subsequently served as a director with Pacific Insurance and Guinea Airways. He died in Melbourne of chronic respiratory disease on 14 February 1966. Survived by his wife and four children, he was buried in Camperdown Cemetery, Victoria, following a funeral at RAAF Base Laverton.

Cole Street and the Cole Street Conservation Precinct at Point Cook Base, RAAF Williams, are named for Adrian Cole. His decorations were held by the Naval and Military Club, Melbourne, where he had been a long-standing member. In July 2009, following the club's dissolution, the medals were to be auctioned along with other memorabilia. This action was challenged by Cole's family, who argued that his decorations were only on loan to the club, and should be donated to the Australian War Memorial (AWM). As the Supreme Court of Victoria deliberated on the case, the parties involved negotiated a settlement whereby Cole's medals were transferred to the AWM.

== Notes ==
Military offices
Preceded by Air Vice Marshal John Cole-Hamilton	Air Officer Commanding RAF in Northern Ireland; 1942–1943	Succeeded by Air Vice Marshal Donald Stevenson
Preceded by Air Commodore Frank Bladin	Air Officer Commanding North-Western Area; 1943–1944	Succeeded by Air Commodore Alan Charlesworth
Preceded by Air Vice Marshal William Anderson	Air Member for Personnel; 1944	Succeeded by Air Commodore Frederick Scherger
