= Beefsteak Charlie's =

New York restaurant chain

- Industry: Restaurant
- Founded: ≈1914 (original); 1976 (chain)
- Defunct: 1987 (chain); c. 2009 (last known individual shop)
- Headquarters: Manhattan, New York
- Key people: Charles Chessar (original); Larry Ellman (chain)
- Parent: Beefsteak Charlies, Inc. (-1985); Lifestyle Restaurants, Inc. (1985–87); Bombay Palace Restaurants (1987–?)

Beefsteak Charlie's was a well-known New York City restaurant in the early 20th century, and later a restaurant chain based in the New York metropolitan area, which grew to over 60 locations in the early 1980s.

== History ==
=== Original restaurant ===
Charles W. Chessar was a New York City restaurateur who was nicknamed "Beefsteak Charlie" by Howard Williams, a sports editor for the New York Morning Telegraph. Chessar opened his first restaurant around 1910, and moved to 50th Street between Broadway and Eighth Avenue in 1914, which he operated until 1934. The restaurant was filled with horse racing photographs and frequented by sports enthusiasts, and the specialty of the house was a steak sandwich. A fire in March 1933 destroyed many of the racing pictures, though some still remain in the family of the subsequent owner, William Soshnick.

After Chessar left, his namesake restaurant was owned and operated by William Soshnick, who migrated to the U.S. along with his family to avoid anti-semitic oppression in Congress Poland. Soshnick was one of five immigrant brothers that eventually owned and operated small markets, butcher shops as well as the White Rose bars in New York City. William Soshnick sold Beefsteak Charlie's upon his retirement in the late 1960s and moved to Tucson, Arizona. During Soshnick's ownership the restaurant became a popular hangout for jazz musicians in the 1950s and 1960s.

=== Chain expansion ===
The Beefsteak Charlie's restaurant chain was started in early 1976 by restaurateur Larry Ellman, whose Steak & Brew chain (part of the Longchamps organization) had filed for Chapter 11 reorganization in fall 1975: Steak & Brew, Inc., was renamed Beefsteak Charlies, Inc., many Steak & Brew locations were converted into Beefsteak Charlie's. As the chain first filed for a trademark on the "Beefsteak Charlie's" name in March 1976, and no prior trademark existed, it appears there was no direct connection to the namesake restaurant which inspired the chain.

Beefsteak Charlie's marketing concept emphasized an all-you-can-eat salad bar, as well as unlimited beer, wine, or sangria. Early 1980s advertising featured an actor in early 20th century dress playing the role of Beefsteak Charlie, later joined by his nephew "Beefsteak Chuck." Two of the chain's famous indulgent slogans were "I'll feed you like there's no tomorrow" and "You're gonna get spoiled."

By 1984, the chain had over 60 locations, primarily on the East Coast. Corporate owner Beefsteak Charlies, Inc., changed its name in 1985 to Lifestyle Restaurants, Inc. In August 1987, the chain was acquired by Bombay Palace Restaurants, via a merger with Lifestyle Restaurants for a reported $8.4 million in stock. At the time of the 1987 merger, the chain had 48 locations, but had closed 20 locations and lost $20 million since 1984. When Bombay filed for bankruptcy two years later, the chain had only 35 outlets.

In 1992, the chain was advertising its two remaining locations in Manhattan—at 51st Street and Broadway (originally the famous Lindy's location), and at 45th Street and Eighth Avenue. In 2000, franchise restaurant operator The Riese Organization converted its 45th Street location into Joe Franklin's Memory Lane Restaurant. A Manhattan location on Eighth Avenue at the Howard Johnson's Plaza hotel closed shortly after September 11, 2001.

Several locations remained until the early 2000s. At least as of March 2003, one "Beefsteak Charlie's" was advertised as being open in Elmsford, New York, though it is unclear whether the restaurant had any connection to the prior chain, as the chain's trademarks had expired, and a new registration was filed in 2001. In 2009, a new Beefsteak Charlie's opened in the Westfield Sunrise Mall in Nassau County, New York, which closed shortly after its opening.

== In popular culture ==
- The name may possibly have originated from a story by O. Henry.
- The closing song on Todd Rundgren's 1976 album Faithful, "Boogies (Hamburger Hell)", opens with a reference to Beefsteak Charlie's. Former Rundgren & Utopia drummer, Kevin Ellman, had departed in 1975 to operate the chain along with his family, becoming Vice President.
- The restaurant was parodied in a 1980 Saturday Night Live skit as "Pre-Chew Charlie's", a steakhouse where the waiters come to your table and chew your food for you.
- In a 1998 episode of the sitcom Friends (Season 4, Episode 13, "The One With Rachel's Crush"), Chandler becomes intoxicated at the restaurant after thinking his girlfriend cheated on him. He drunkenly calls the restaurant "Beefsteak Chulie's", prompting Rachel to correct him.
- In a 2002 episode of the sitcom Will & Grace (Season 5, Episode 6, "Boardroom & A Parked Place"), Will takes a group poll which decides to dine at the restaurant, despite one holdout voting for T.G.I. Friday's.
- A 2005 episode of comedy-drama television series Entourage (Season 2, Episode 3, "Aquamansion") mentions Beefsteak Charlie's.
- A 2018 episode of the sitcom The Goldbergs (Season 5, Episode 12, "Dinner with the Goldbergs"), the family goes to Beefsteak Charlie's for Erica's birthday.
- A 2018 episode of Maniac (Season 1, Episode 4, "Furs by Sebastian"), shows Beefsteak Charlie's in the background as part of a strip mall.
- In the 2024 movie Ricky Stanicky, John Cena's titular character mentions that he "had a job peeling shrimp at Beefsteak Charlie's." Later in the movie, the character JT also says "[h]oney, he worked at Beefsteak Charlie's."
