= Tads =

Tads may refer to:

- TADS/PNVS, Target Acquisition and Designation Sights, Pilot Night Vision System
- Text Adventure Development System, a programming language
- Tad's Steaks, a restaurant chain
