= The Riese Organization =

New York City investment company

The Riese Organization (/ris/) is a privately held investment company based in New York City that is heavily invested in real estate and in franchised fast food and casual dining restaurants in Manhattan.

== History ==
Irving and Murray Riese, two brothers born in Harlem, opened their first restaurant, a luncheonette in midtown Manhattan, in 1940, for about $8,500. Five years later, the brothers sold the luncheonette for $38,500, and they used the profit to start a business of flipping troubled restaurant properties after quickly refurbishing them. Murray told The New York Times in 1983 that they had bought and sold as many as 25 restaurants in one month. The brothers incorporated National Restaurants Management, Inc., to acquire and operate restaurants, after a court had ruled in 1953 that the Riese brothers were real estate brokers, and that they could not claim lower capital gains tax rates on restaurants that they had held for less than three years.

In 1972, the Riese Organization had about 150 restaurants in its portfolio, making it the United States's largest privately owned restaurant business. By 1989, the company had about 300 restaurants.

The Riese Organization is credited with introducing the food court concept to New York in the 1980s. In 1982, Marriott Corporation, which owned the Roy Rogers restaurant chain, sued Riese for planning to colocate a Roy Rogers with a Pizza Hut and a Häagen-Dazs ice cream shop in one Times Square location; after the Riese family won, they opened additional food courts with as many as eight brands in one location. By the late 1980s, the Riese Organization had licenses to run operations for 28 franchises in New York City, most of them on an exclusive basis.

=== Decline and bankruptcy ===
Irving Riese died in 1990. His brother Murray Riese died in 1995. Murray's son Dennis operated the business until 1988, when he left the firm; he returned in 1991, and became the chief executive after Murray's death.

The company took a $140 million loan from the Bank of Tokyo–Mitsubishi Trust Company, with 14 properties as collateral; during the 1990s, the company sold properties, closed restaurants, and changed its business strategy to improve profitability. National Restaurants Management filed for chapter 11 bankruptcy protection in 1999; the Riese Organization, as a subsidiary, was not affected, and reorganization in 2000 placed National Restaurants under the Riese Organization.

=== Pivot to casual dining ===
In 2013, Dennis Riese told Crain's New York Business that his company "will be much less known for fast food," by opening more casual dining eateries with table service. At that time, the company had about 75 restaurants, and owned 25 buildings, collectively generating $100 million in annual revenue. About 60 of the company's restaurants, contributing about one-third of Riese's revenue, were fast food restaurants; Dennis told Crain's that he did not intend to increase his fast food holdings.

Dennis Riese said in 2019 that he intends to wind down his company's restaurant business due to rising wages, changing labor laws, and changes in the retail landscape. He announced an investment in Loudpack, a recreational marijuana business based in California, which he sees as an opportunity for growth.

== Legal issues ==
Although Riese's food court restaurants took and fulfilled orders from different retail units, sometimes on separate floors of a building, they had a centralized kitchen to reduce operating costs. This violated the terms of many franchise agreements, although the Rieses used their wealth and real estate holdings to exert leverage over brand owners. In the 1990s, Riese took the unusual step of cobranding its food courts and franchised restaurants with "Riese Restaurants" on signage, prompting an unsuccessful lawsuit from T.G.I. Friday's for violating Friday's franchise agreement.

In 1998, the front page of the New York Post showed a Riese-owned Dunkin' Donuts franchise infested with rats, one of which was eating a coconut doughnut. This caused a public relations crisis for Riese and Dunkin', which resulted in lawsuits and the termination of the franchise agreement. In 2009, Riese closed its 12 Dunkin' restaurants and one Dunkin' food cart, and three days later, all 13 locations reopened as the first Tim Hortons locations in New York City.

Between 1996 and 1999, the Riese Organization had a labor dispute with workers represented by Local 100 of the Hotel Employees and Restaurant Employees Union. The union criticized Riese's practice of closing a restaurant after it became unionized, laying off all staff, and then reopening a non-union restaurant at the same location. Dennis Riese defended the practice, saying that his company was replacing restaurants that had gone out of style.

In 2015, former staff members of a T.G.I. Friday's restaurant owned by Riese sued the company, alleging racial discrimination. Riese closed a Friday's location on 34th Street whose service staff was mostly Black, and hired only one of the Black workers when they opened another Friday's location one block away. The lawsuit alleged that managers referred to the former restaurant and its dark-skinned staffers in derogatory ways. In 2018, the Riese Organization sold five parcels at the corner of 34th Street and Third Avenue in Murray Hill for $79.5 million.

The Riese Organization closed its web site in 2017 out of concerns that it was not compliant with the Americans with Disabilities Act, which Dennis Riese said might prompt a lawsuit.

== Restaurant brands ==
Most of the Riese Organization's restaurants have historically been chain restaurants, to appeal to tourists who would recognize a familiar name. The company has operated franchises of T.G.I. Friday's, Houlihan's, Beefsteak Charlie's, Tim Hortons, Chock full o'Nuts lunch counters, Roy Rogers restaurants, Pizza Hut, and KFC. The company has also developed its own restaurant brands, including Tad's Steaks, Charley O's, Martini's, and Tequilaville.

The company purchased the Lindy's name, trading on the nostalgia of the former restaurant. The company also owned Lüchow's and four Longchamps restaurants. The company bought Childs Restaurants, reopening many of its former restaurants under other brands.
