= Central Area Command (RAAF) =

Royal Australian Air Force command

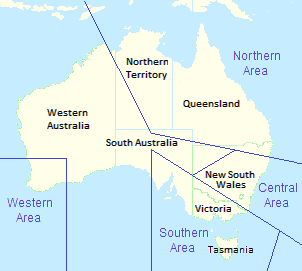
- Provisional RAAF area command boundaries, February 1940
- Active: 1940–41
- Allegiance: Australia
- Branch: Royal Australian Air Force
- Role: Air defence Aerial reconnaissance Protection of adjacent sea lanes
- Garrison/HQ: Sydney
- Engagements: World War II

Commanders
- Notable commanders: Adrian Cole (1940); William Anderson (1940–41)

Central Area Command was one of several geographically based commands raised by the Royal Australian Air Force (RAAF) during World War II. It was formed in March 1940, and covered the central portion of New South Wales. Headquartered at Sydney, Central Area Command was responsible for air defence, aerial reconnaissance and protection of the sea lanes within its boundaries. It was disbanded in August 1941 and control of its units taken over by other RAAF formations. Proposals in 1943–44 to raise a new Central Area Command did not come to fruition.

== History ==
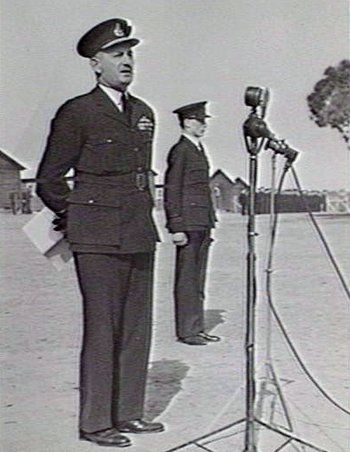
Air Commodore Cole, inaugural AOC Central Area, addressing Empire Air Training Scheme pupils, August 1940

Prior to World War II, the Royal Australian Air Force was small enough for all its elements to be directly controlled by RAAF Headquarters in Melbourne. After war broke out in September 1939, the RAAF began to implement a decentralised form of command, commensurate with expected increases in manpower and units. Its initial move in this direction was to create Nos. 1 and 2 Groups to control units in Victoria and New South Wales, respectively. Then, between March 1940 and May 1941, the RAAF divided Australia and New Guinea into four geographically based command-and-control zones: Central Area, Southern Area, Western Area, and Northern Area. The roles of these area commands were air defence, protection of adjacent sea lanes, and aerial reconnaissance. Each was led by an Air Officer Commanding (AOC) responsible for the administration and operations of all air bases and units within his boundary.

No. 2 Group, which had been established on 20 November 1939, was re-formed as one of the first two area commands, Central Area, on 7 March 1940. Headquartered in Sydney, Central Area Command was given control of all Air Force units in New South Wales except those in the southern Riverina and the north of the state. Units in Queensland were also temporarily assigned to its control, pending the formation of Northern Area. Central Area's inaugural AOC was Air Commodore Adrian "King" Cole, who had also led No. 2 Group. His senior air staff officer was Wing Commander Alan Charlesworth.

In May 1940 the area's headquarters moved from "Mt Loana" in Point Piper to the mansion "Kilmory" close by. Cole handed over command of Central Area to Air Commodore Bill Anderson in December 1940. By August 1941, the RAAF's expanding instructional program necessitated the establishment of overarching training organisations on a semi-functional, semi-geographical basis. Accordingly, No. 2 (Training) Group was formed in Sydney, taking responsibility for the training units then under Central Area, which was disbanded. Control of other Central Area units was "divided as convenient", according to the official history of the war, between Northern and Southern Area Commands.

== Aftermath ==
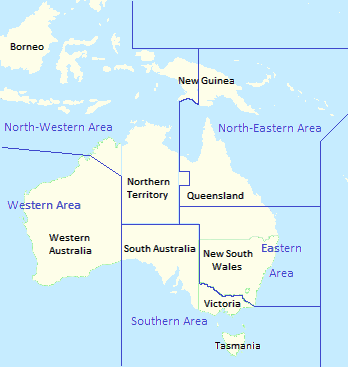
RAAF area commands, November 1942

The RAAF's area command structure was revised in 1942, following the outbreak of the Pacific War: Northern Area was split into North-Eastern Area and North-Western Area, and a new command covering New South Wales and southern Queensland, Eastern Area, was created, making a total of five commands. In October 1943, the Air Board proposed carving a new Central Area Command out of Eastern Area, which by then was considered too large to be controlled by one headquarters and therefore ripe for subdivision. This Central Area Command would have been responsible for training and operational units in southern Queensland. The War Cabinet deferred its decision on the proposal. The concept was raised again in August 1944, and this time the new Central Area Command was to control maintenance units, as well as training and operations, in southern Queensland. Once again, nothing came of the proposal.
