= Lindy effect =

Theorized increase of longevity with age

The Lindy effect (also known as Lindy's law) is a theorized phenomenon by which the future life expectancy of some non-perishable thing, like a technology or an idea, is proportional to its current age. Thus, the Lindy effect proposes the longer a period something has survived to exist or be used in the present, the longer its remaining life expectancy. Longevity is a resistance to change, obsolescence, or competition, and greater odds of continued existence into the future. Where the Lindy effect applies, mortality rate decreases with time. Mathematically, the Lindy effect corresponds to lifetimes following a Pareto probability distribution.

The concept is named after Lindy's delicatessen in New York City, where the concept was informally theorized by comedians: a show running only two weeks would be expected to last another two weeks, while a show that has lasted two years could expect a further two-year run. The Lindy effect has subsequently been theorized by mathematicians and statisticians. Nassim Nicholas Taleb has expressed the Lindy effect in terms of "distance from an absorbing barrier".

The Lindy effect applies to non-perishable items, like books, those that do not have an "unavoidable expiration date". For example, human beings are perishable: the life expectancy at birth in developed countries is about 80 years. So the Lindy effect does not apply to individual human lifespan: all else being equal, it is less likely for a 10-year-old human to die within the next year than for a 100-year-old, while the Lindy effect would predict the opposite.

== History ==
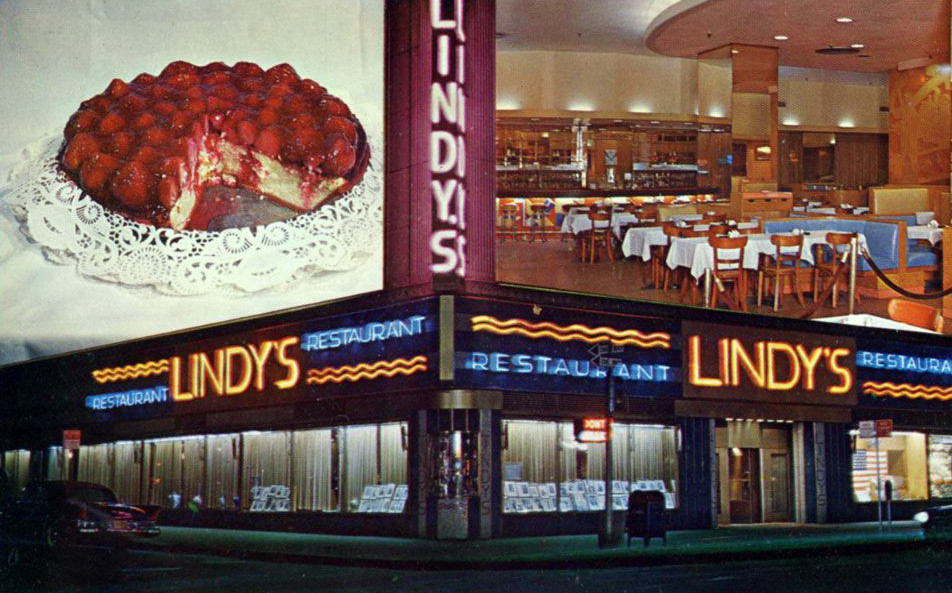
Lindy's delicatessen at Broadway and 51st St in New York City

The origin of the term can be traced to Albert Goldman and a 1964 article he had written in The New Republic titled "Lindy's Law." The term Lindy refers to Lindy's delicatessen in New York, where comedians "foregather every night [to] conduct post-mortems on recent show business 'action.'" In this article, Goldman describes a folkloric belief among New York City media observers that the amount of material comedians have is constant, and therefore, the frequency of output predicts how long their series will last:

... the life expectancy of a television comedian is [inversely] proportional to the total amount of his exposure on the medium. If, pathetically deluded by hubris, he undertakes a regular weekly or even monthly program, his chances of survival beyond the first season are slight; but if he adopts the conservation of resources policy favored by these senescent philosophers of "the Business," and confines himself to "specials" and "guest shots," he may last to the age of Ed Wynn [d. age 79 in 1966 while still acting in movies]

Benoit Mandelbrot defined a different concept with the same name in his 1982 book The Fractal Geometry of Nature. In Mandelbrot's version, comedians do not have a fixed amount of comedic material to spread over TV appearances, but rather, the more appearances they make, the more future appearances they are predicted to make: Mandelbrot expressed mathematically that for certain things bounded by the life of the producer, like human promise, future life expectancy is proportional to the past. He references Lindy's Law and a parable of the young poets' cemetery and then applies to researchers and their publications: "However long a person's past collected works, it will on the average continue for an equal additional amount. When it eventually stops, it breaks off at precisely half of its promise."

In Nassim Nicholas Taleb's 2012 book Antifragile: Things That Gain from Disorder he for the first time explicitly referred to his idea as the Lindy Effect, removed the bounds of the life of the producer to include anything which doesn't have a natural upper bound, and incorporated it into his broader theory of the Antifragile.

If a book has been in print for forty years, I can expect it to be in print for another forty years. But, and that is the main difference, if it survives another decade, then it will be expected to be in print another fifty years. This, simply, as a rule, tells you why things that have been around for a long time are not "aging" like persons, but "aging" in reverse. Every year that passes without extinction doubles the additional life expectancy. This is an indicator of some robustness. The robustness of an item is proportional to its life!

According to Taleb, Mandelbrot agreed with the expanded definition of the Lindy Effect: "I [Taleb] suggested the boundary perishable/nonperishable and he [Mandelbrot] agreed that the nonperishable would be power-law distributed while the perishable (the initial Lindy story) worked as a mere metaphor."

Taleb further defined the term in Skin in the Game, where he linked Lindy with fragility, disorder and time. To Taleb, "the theory of fragility directly leads to the Lindy effect," as he defines "fragility as sensitivity to disorder," and states that "time is equivalent to disorder, and resistance to the ravages of time, that is, what we gloriously call survival, is the ability to handle disorder." As time operates through "skin in the game," Taleb believes that "[t]hings that have survived are hinting to us ‘ex post’ that they have some robustness." He concludes therefore that "the only effective judge of things is time," which in his view answers the "age-old meta-questions: Who will judge the expert? Who will guard the guard? [...] Well, survival will." He further states that the Lindy effect in itself is "Lindy-proof," citing the words of pre-Socratic philosopher Periander ("Use laws that are old but food that is fresh") and Alfonso X of Castile ("Burn old logs. Drink old wine. Read old books. Keep old friends.")

Contemporary proponents of the Lindy effect include Twitter user Paul Skallas, known as LindyMan, and Marc Andreessen, co-founder of Andreessen Horowitz. Skallas promotes a lifestyle inspired by the Lindy effect, an eclectic mix of Mediterranean writers such as Greek philosopher Plutarch and Catholic theologian Thomas Aquinas, and the presumed lifestyles of Mediterranean peoples. Writing for The New York Times, Ezra Marcus notes that Skallas' approach to the Lindy effect breaks with Taleb's statistical analysis by focusing on lifestyle topics such as diet, dating, and exercise. Skallas advocates skepticism toward new products and new ideas that have not yet proven their durability. Skallas recognizes that cultural longevity does not imply a moral value, noting, for instance, that sexual abuse by a rich man such as Jeffrey Epstein is also "Lindy".

== Mathematical formulation ==
Mathematically, the relation postulated by the Lindy effect can be expressed as the following statement about a random variable T corresponding to the lifetime of the object (e.g. a comedy show), which is assumed to take values in the range $c \leq T < \infty$ (with a lower bound $c \geq 0$):

$$\mathrm{E} [T-t\mid T>t]=p \cdot t.$$

Here the left hand side denotes the conditional expectation of the remaining lifetime $T-t$, given that $T$ has exceeded $t$, and the parameter $p$ on the right hand side (called "Lindy proportion" by Iddo Eliazar) is a positive constant.

This is equivalent to the survival function of T being

$$\Phi(t) := \text{Pr}(T>t) = \left(\frac{c}{t}\right)^\epsilon, \text{ where }  \epsilon = 1 + \frac{1}{p},$$

which has the hazard function

$$- \frac{\Phi'(t)}{\Phi(t)} = \frac{\epsilon}{t} = \frac{1+p}{p}\frac{1}{t}.$$

This means that the lifetime $T$ follows a Pareto distribution (a power-law distribution) with exponent $\epsilon$.

Conversely, however, only Pareto distributions with exponent $1< \epsilon < \infty$ correspond to a lifetime distribution that satisfies Lindy's Law, since the Lindy proportion $p$ is required to be positive and finite (in particular, the lifetime $T$ is assumed to have a finite expectation value). Iddo Eliazar has proposed an alternative formulation of Lindy's Law involving the median instead of the mean (expected value) of the remaining lifetime $T-t$, which corresponds to Pareto distributions for the lifetime $T$ with the full range of possible Pareto exponents $0 < \epsilon < \infty$. Eliazar also demonstrated a relation to Zipf’s Law, and to socioeconomic inequality, arguing that "Lindy’s Law, Pareto’s Law and Zipf’s Law are in effect synonymous laws."

== See also ==
- Doomsday argument
- Memorylessness
- Longevity escape velocity
- Planning fallacy
- Preferential attachment
- Survivorship curve
- Survivorship bias
- Weibull distribution
- German tank problem
- Copernican principle
