= Lindy's =

Coordinates: 40.76298°N 73.98159°W

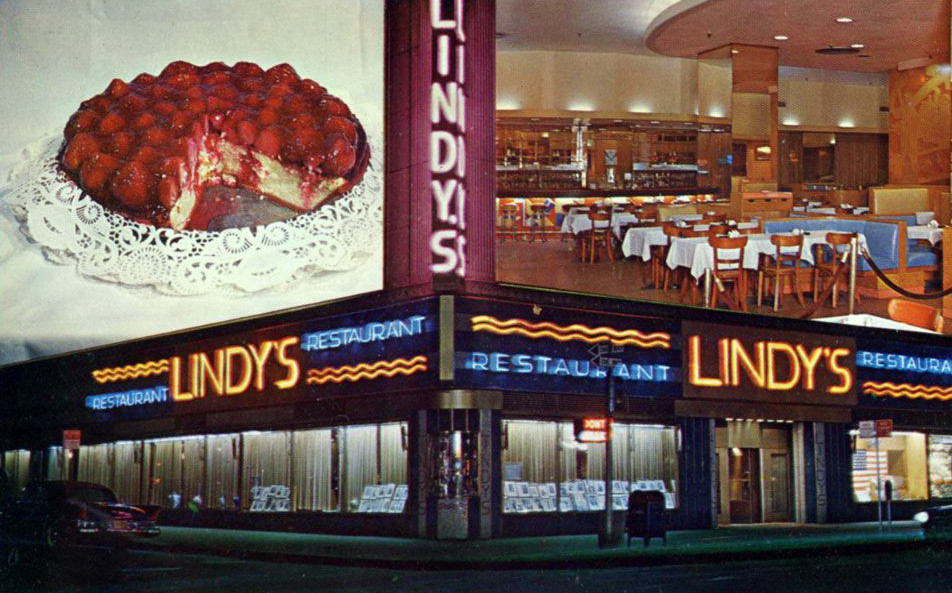
- The Lindy's location at Broadway and 51st Street; a look at the interior and the famous Lindy's cheesecake.
- Interactive map of Lindy's

Restaurant information
- Established: 1921
- Closed: February 7, 2018
- Location: Manhattan, New York City, New York, United States

Lindy's was two different deli and restaurant chains in Manhattan, New York City. The first chain, founded by Leo "Lindy" Lindemann, operated from 1921 to 1969. In 1979, the Riese Organization determined that the Lindy's trademark had been abandoned, and opened new restaurants, the last of which closed in February 2018.

== Locations ==
The original chain had locations at 1626 Broadway (at NE corner of 49th Street; now occupied by a Junior's Restaurant, as of July 2023) and 1655 Broadway (at NW corner of 51st Street; now occupied by a McDonald's Restaurant, as of October 2020).

The Riese's Lindy's were located at 825 7th Avenue (at 53rd Street) and 401 7th Avenue at 32nd Street (now closed). The location at Seventh Avenue at W. 53rd Street closed in 2018.

== History ==
Lindy's was opened by Leo "Lindy" Lindemann (died 1957, Parkinson's disease) and his wife Clara on August 20, 1921, and was located at 1626 Broadway, between 49th and 50th Streets. A second location was opened at 1655 Broadway in 1929.

The original Lindy's location closed in 1957. Since June 2017, a Junior's Restaurant now occupies the venerated location.

In 1969, the 1655 Broadway location was acquired by Longchamps restaurants, who closed the restaurant in September 1969 to convert it into a steak house (it became a Steak & Brew and later a Beefsteak Charlie's).

Lindy's was especially well known for its cheesecake, which was at times credited as perhaps the most famous in the United States. The cheesecake was immortalized in Guys and Dolls, where Nathan Detroit and Sky Masterson sang its praises.

The "Lindy's" name and concept was resurrected in 1979 by New York City restaurant operator the Riese Organization, who determined that the name had fallen into the public domain, and later obtained the trademark.

== Clientele ==
Harpo Marx frequently ate at Lindy's in the 1920s, writing,

I had a home again, and during the day a choice of two homes-away-from-home, Lindy's or Reuben's. I was back with my own people, who spoke my language, with my accent - cardplayers, horseplayers, bookies, song-pluggers, agents, actors out of work and actors playing the Palace, Al Jolson with his mob of fans, and Arnold Rothstein with his mob of runners and flunkies. The cheesecake was ambrosia. The talk was old, familiar music. A lot of yucks. A lot of action. Home Sweet Home.

Jewish Mafia icon Arnold Rothstein claimed Lindy's as his favorite "office" and would stand on the corner, surrounded by bodyguards, and conduct business outside. On the day that Rothstein was killed in 1928, the last place he visited before the murder was Lindy's and he received a phone call at Lindy´s.

On April 5, 1956, Abraham Telvi, a mobster and hit man, attacked journalist Victor Riesel with acid, blinding him as he left the restaurant.

Milton Berle frequented Lindy's almost on a nightly basis.

Groucho Marx was eating there with Dick Cavett and Woody Allen in the 1960s when they informed him that his work was appreciated by college students of the time.

== In popular culture ==
Historian Albert Goldman named the Lindy effect for the restaurant.

Damon Runyon was a big fan and wrote the restaurant into his books as "Mindy's." The musical Guys and Dolls, based on Runyon's writings, immortalizes Lindy's in one of its songs.

The commonly told "Waiter, there's a fly in my soup" joke is theorised to have originated at Lindy's during its original incarnation.

Lindy's is referenced in The Critic episode "Dukerella."

Lindy's is referenced in Billy Wilder's Ace in the Hole (1951 film).

In the 1952 film Pat and Mike, Lindy's is shown as the location where Pat (Katharine Hepburn) signs a contract with Mike (Spencer Tracy), making him her agent and manager.

Lindy’s is referenced in the opening paragraph of the 1952 science fiction novel by Leigh Brackett The Galactic Breed published in Ace Double D-99, 1955 (List of Ace double titles).

In season 4 episode 10 of I Love Lucy, entitled “Ricky’s Contract,” Lucy tells Fred and Ethel that Ricky took his entire band to Lindy’s to celebrate learning that he had been offered a movie contract.

Donald Fagen's song, "Good Stuff" (2012), from the album Sunken Condos, is a prohibition-era gangland fantasy that uses Lindy's as a location.

Lindy's is pictured in the closing scene of Friday the 13th, VIII, Jason Takes Manhattan

In the 1969 movie Midnight Cowboy, the man on the telephone with Cass (Morey) making dinner plans can be heard through the receiver mentioning Lindy’s.

== See also ==
- List of Ashkenazi Jewish restaurants
- List of delicatessens
- Lindy effect
