= Lüchow's =

Defunct restaurant in Manhattan, New York

Coordinates: 40°44′2″N 73°59′20.5″W

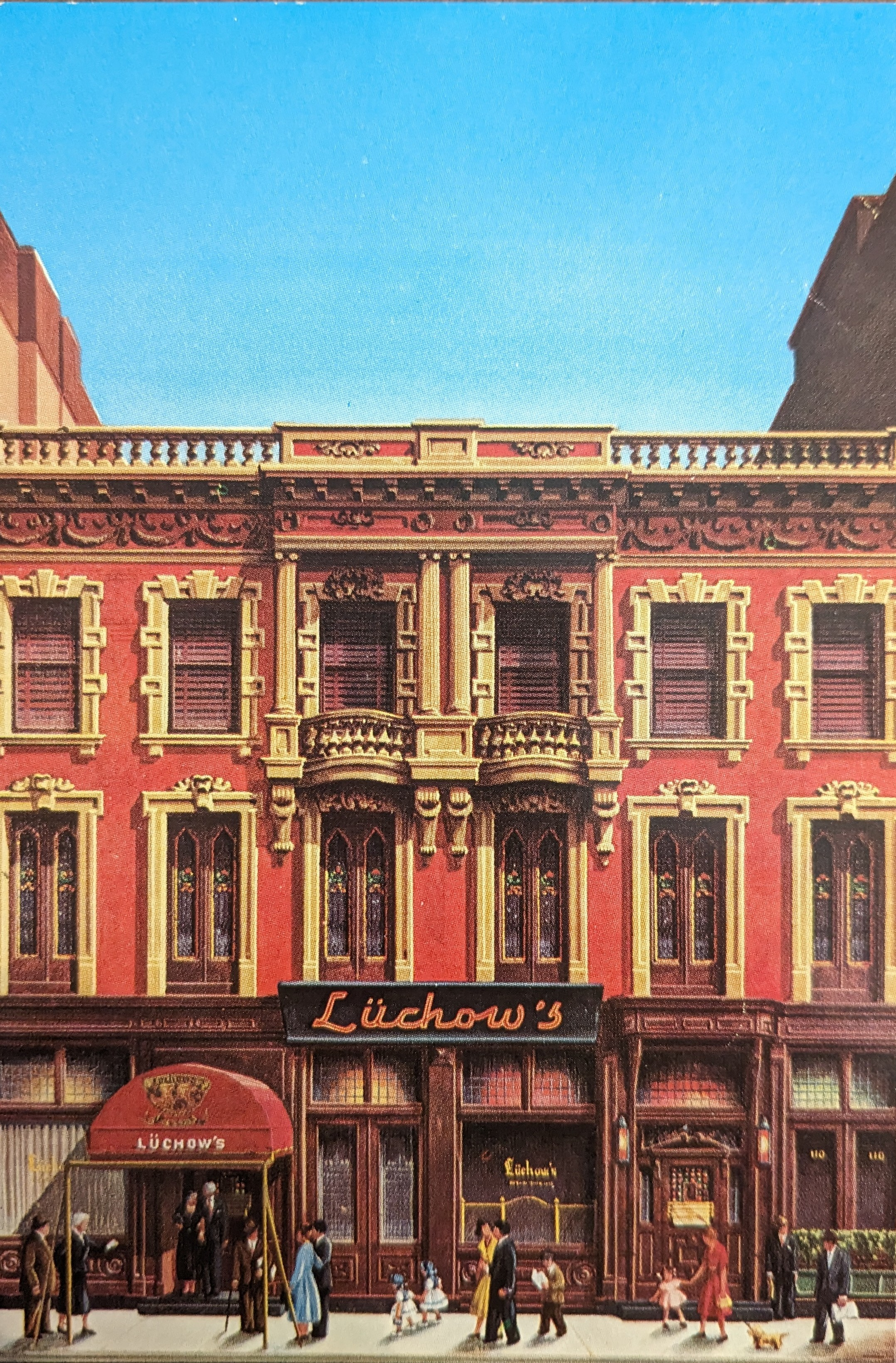
Caption from postcard: 80th Anniversary. Renowned for its superb food, imported beers, and fine wines, Luchow's, The Gourmets' Rendezvous Since 1882, continues to be the favorite eating place of the world's celebrities. Open every day except Monday.

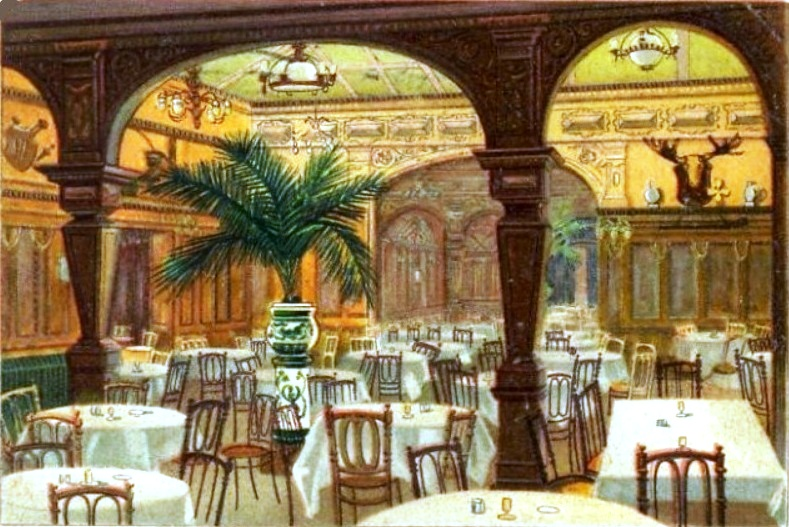
Luchow's c. 1902: "Garden" as seen from "Cafe" showing the effect created by skylights added in the extensive 1902 construction. The big arched opening at the rear is actually a mirror. Gaslights are shown. To the left is the door where the headwaiter stood. Within, right, is the office, later a semi-private dining room.

Lüchow's was a restaurant at 110 East 14th Street at Irving Place in the East Village (near Union Square) in Manhattan, New York City, with the property running clear through the block to 13th Street. It was established in 1882 – at a time when the surrounding neighborhood was primarily residential – when a German immigrant, August Lüchow, purchased the cafe where he worked as a bartender and waiter. Lüchow's remained in operation at this place for a full century, becoming a favorite establishment for people in the entertainment world, helped by its proximity to the Academy of Music, the city's opera house, as well as Steinway Hall and Tammany Hall, where other entertainment was offered.

Although in the 1930s columnist O. O. McIntyre had written "In a changing world, nothing changes at Lüchow's", eventually even the long-running establishment came to an end, closing after an attempt to stimulate business in 1982 by moving to the Theater District. This new effort failed and ended in 1984, leaving behind satellite locations which closed permanently in May 1986. The 14th Street building was finally demolished in 1995 after being gutted by a fire the year before.

== Pronunciation ==
The German name Lüchow is pronounced [ˈlyːçoː] with the ⟨w⟩ being silent. The restaurant's name has generally been pronounced /ˈluːtʃaʊz/ LOO-chowz, an Anglicization. The umlaut over the ⟨ü⟩ was left out between 1917 and 1950, which is said to have caused difficulties: "The absence of the umlaut had led many new customers to believe that the place was a Chinese restaurant," according to The New York Times.

== History ==
Through the doors of Luchow's pass all the famous people of the world.

— Legend seen on entering the main reception room,
originally said by James Montgomery Flagg

August Guido Lüchow immigrated from Hanover, Germany, to the United States in 1879, at the age of 23. After working as waiter for a cafe on Duane Street, he became a bartender and waiter at a cafe and beer garden belonging to Baron von Mehlbach. Three years later, he was able to purchase the business with the help of a $1500 loan from William Steinway, the piano magnate, whose Steinway Hall venue was across the street at Union Square, and who was a regular customer at the von Mehlbach establishment. The property was only about an eighth in size of what would become Lüchow's, and did not yet reach 13th Street on the downtown side.

At that time the stretch of 14th Street extending crosstown on either side of Union Square was at the heart of the most prestigious part of the city, and August Lüchow's new establishment quickly became known as "the capital of 14th Street".

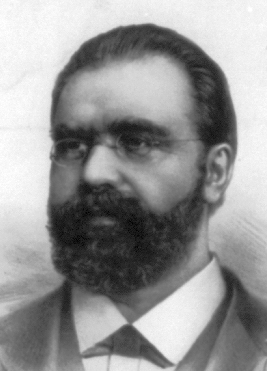
William Steinway has been called the "patron saint" of Lüchow's

Diamond Jim Brady was a habitué of the restaurant ...

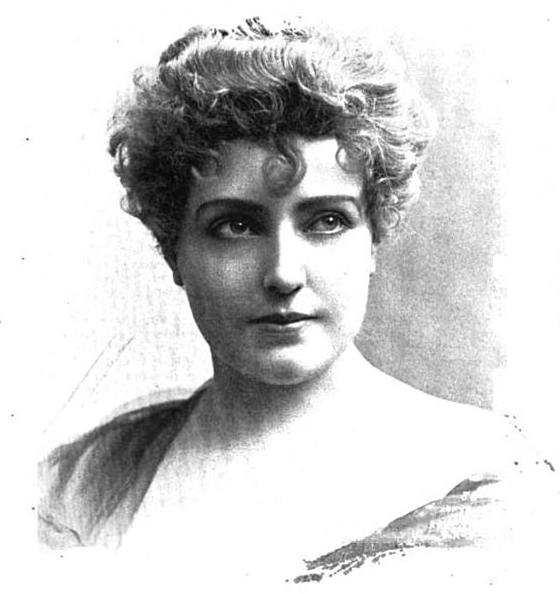
... and had noted actress Lillian Russell as his eating companion

Steinway and his circle of touring and transplanted European musicians comprised Lüchow's core clientele during the early years. A pre-sailing farewell engagement at Lüchow's in honor of the pianist Ignaz Paderewski – which lasted six hours – is noted by The New York Times in 1906. James Huneker, writing for the Times in 1919, describes how he was called upon in the 1890s to introduce Antonín Dvořák – who is referred to as "Old Borax" – to New York society by founder of the National Conservatory Jeanette Myers Thurber, who had engaged the composer to lead her nascent musical institution: "Later we went down to Gus Lüchow's. For a musician not to be seen at Lüchow's argued that he was unknown in the social world of tone." Huneker also relates several anecdotes about Oscar Hammerstein, another Lüchow's regular.

=== Early operation ===
By 1885 Lüchow had become the American agent for Würzburger Beer and shortly thereafter for Pilsner, another famous brand, made with soft water. Space was at a premium, and so the beer garden located behind the original restaurant on the east was made to provide access to a newly purchased lot extending back to 13th Street, on which stables were built to enable delivery of beer throughout the city. In 1902 further construction was undertaken, converting the stables, beer garden, and another large space behind the bar on the west into three ornate dark-paneled rooms, two of which had 30-foot (9.1 m) ceilings – with frosted skylights with etched stained glass. These became known as the "Heidelberg Room" – still being called "the New Room" eighty years later, "Garden" – because it occupied the location of the original beer garden – and "Cafe", respectively. With the purchase in 1910 of the Huber Museum property at 106 East 14th Street the restaurant's physical layout took its final form, allowing the addition of two more public rooms: Hunting, and Nibelungen. The restaurant opened a satellite restaurant at the 1901 Pan-American Exposition held in Buffalo, NY, as part of its German Village ("Alt Nürnberg").

The Heidelberg Room featured a large painting of The Potato Gatherers by Swedish artist August Hagborg, that Lüchow had purchased at the St. Louis World's Fair in 1904, when he was there to run the food concession for the Tyrolean Alps Exhibit. The painting was still to be found in its place at the back of the New Room in 1980 – near the 13th Street entrance. Also prominent in the Heidelberg Room was an extremely large model of the four masted clipper ship Great Republic which was visible from the majority of tables in the six main rooms, in addition to numerous "small masterpieces of the Dutch, Austrian and Flemish schools". Multitudes of mounted animal heads and colorful beer steins having German and Austrian geographical significance – of varied and sometimes extreme size – were displayed throughout the room. The Hunting (or Hunt) Room – where, as latter-day owner Jan Mitchell once observed "twenty-one mounted deer heads gaze in blank nonchalance upon the pleasant spectacle of their descendants being eaten with considerable satisfaction" – was especially prolific in regard to taxidermy, and provided a few big tables to accommodate the larger parties of guests within the public rooms.

The Art Nouveau "Diamond Jim Brady Room" was fitted out with matching cabinetry appointments and Tiffany glass, with arched mirrors of beveled glass and cut flowers across an expanse of marble and dark carved mahogany: "At one end stands the knightly figure of Lohengrin, and at the other, on the wall, broods a shaggy buffalo head obtained at the St. Louis World's Fair. An oil painting of Bacchus appropriately surveys this scene from the opposite wall." The room was named after Diamond Jim Brady, a voracious eater who was referred to by one New York restaurateur as "the best twenty-five customers I ever had". Brady was not a gangster, as some assumed, but a successful executive and founder of an automobile and railroad rolling stock manufacturer, the Standard Steel Car Company – later merged with Pullman – who had a passion for fancy jewelry. He said, "Each must have a good time in his own way." Brady's long-time eating companion was the noted actress Lillian Russell, for whom another room at Lüchow's was named.

=== Latter years ===
August Lüchow died in 1923, and ownership of the business passed to Victor Eckstein, who was his nephew-in-law. Prohibition had begun in 1921, and the restaurant had to survive on the strength of its cooking and traditions. After the first few years, Luchow's stopped celebrating New Year's Day, as the customers who brought their own flasks of alcohol were too rowdy. When Prohibition was repealed in 1933, Luchow's was the recipient of the first café liquor license in New York City.

The umlaut in "Lüchow's" was restored in 1950, when Jan Mitchell, an entrepreneur who rescued several New York restaurants – including the Longchamps chain – bought the restaurant from Eckstein after five years of persuasion. Mitchell restored the tradition of holding week-long galas such as the annual Venison Festival, Bock Beer Festival, a goose fest, and so on, but one of the biggest attractions at Lüchow's, and a tremendous customer draw, was the nightly lighting of the Christmas tree, which began around Thanksgiving and lasted till New Year's.

By the time Lüchow's reached its final iteration on 14th Street, it was owned by one of the two big restaurant conglomerates in New York City at the time, Restaurant Associates, having passed from the hands of the other, Riese Brothers, a couple of years before. Over time, the quality of Lüchow's food and service had declined, with stemware abandoned in favor of short glasses, and no tablecloths at lunch, according to employees of the period.

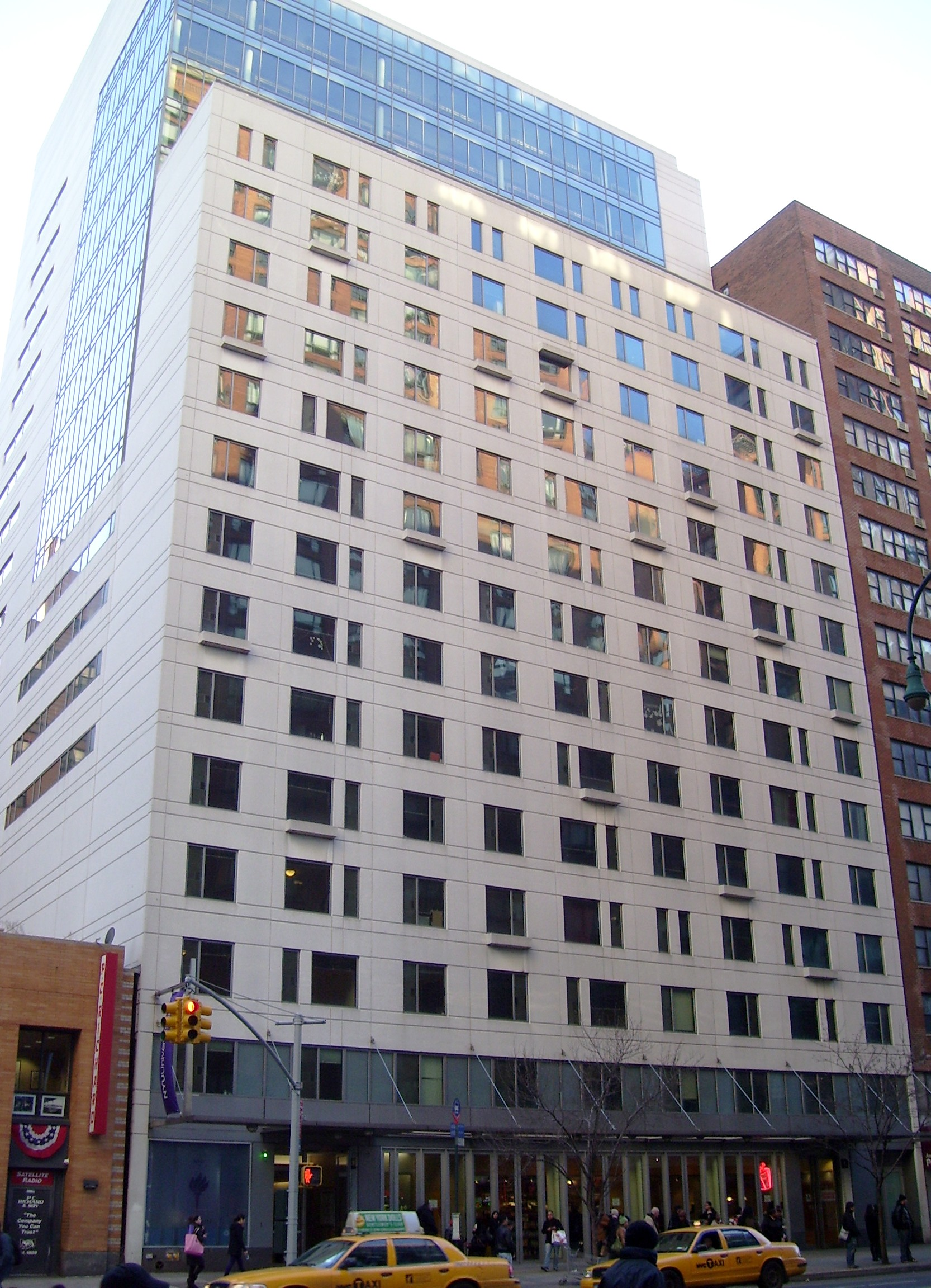
NYU's University Hall was built on the site of Lüchow's in 1998

With completion in 1979 of the final round of refurbishments at 14th Street by Restaurant Associates, whose principal, Peter Aschkenasy, was friends with Mayor Ed Koch, providing much needed publicity, the place was seemingly resurrected, and there were a few years of capacity Christmas season business. Architecture students made their weekly visits to view the eclectic bric-a-brac and statuary, stained glass skylights and art nouveau appointments; and it was said that the frequently mentioned "1500 couverts" (pronounced "covers") in one day occurred multiple times.

=== Demise ===
By the 1980s, the Union Square area had deteriorated considerably. The park itself was run down and in serious need of refurbishment. The discount S. Klein's department store across the street was closed and abandoned; and the movie theatre next to the restaurant had become a rock concert venue, initially also dubbed the "Academy of Music", but later changed to the "Palladium". There was little left in the neighborhood to attract the type of clientele that Luchow's was intended to appeal to, and in 1982–83 the 14th Street location was abandoned, dealing a serious blow to efforts to revitalize the neighborhood. The saleable contents were auctioned off, and the business was moved to a spot below street level at 51st Street and Broadway, with the aim of attracting Theater District crowds, and the umlaut was dropped once again.

The Theatre District restaurant lasted only a few years longer, but Luchow's lived on at other locations, notably Penn Station. Restaurant Associates having decided to branch out and make use of the famous name.

After Lüchow's moved out, the 14th Street location was briefly the "Palace", a nightclub-cabaret-restaurant and later a gay bar. An attempt was made to have the building demolished in 1985, and it stood vacant for several years, never achieving protected landmark status despite local efforts. It became the home of various squatters, drug addicts and prostitutes. In 1994, a mysterious fire destroyed any historic remnant of its vibrant past. The city ordered the building demolished. The building was replaced by University Hall, a New York University dormitory and multi-use complex having retail frontage on 14th Street. Before the dorm was built, NYU announced plans to "revive" Luchow's by including a street-level "Gay 90's" themed restaurant in the building, which they intended to call "Luchow's" if permission could be obtained to do so, but these plans never came to fruition.

== Music ==
At the turn of the twentieth century Lüchow's was prospering, and a good part of the bottom line came from beer sales. Although he was not the first man to serve these fine imported beers in America, he was first to make them popular, a fact attested to by the popular song Harry Von Tilzer wrote to honor August and his restaurant, "Down Where the Würzburger Flows". "The song traveled from Fourteenth Street to the beer gardens of Cincinnati, St. Louis, Chicago, Milwaukee, and far beyond, and attained such popularity that August declared in some bewilderment: 'I feel like a kind of beer Columbus!'"

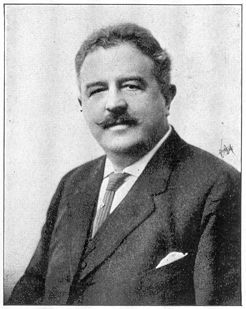
Victor Herbert was instrumental in founding ASCAP in Luchow's

Illustrated bookjacket by co-author and official Luchow's illustrator Ludwig Bemelmans; the restaurant as seen from above the Garden, looking across a corner of the Cafe toward the Hunting Room

Victor Herbert was a concert cellist, conductor and composer of forty-three operettas and numerous other choral and instrumental works. He brought an eight-piece orchestra back from Vienna to perform at Lüchow's after one of his tours, and presided as its leader for nearly four years, starting a musical tradition that carried through to the 1980s. A corner table with a commemorative plaque was remembered at Lüchow's as the "Victor Herbert Corner" and the place where Herbert and his associates founded the American Society of Composers, Authors and Publishers (ASCAP) in 1914. Songwriter Gus Kahn was another regular at the restaurant; he wrote the lyrics for "Yes, Sir, That's My Baby" there.

Other works and composers which were featured at Luchow's include the art songs of Richard Strauss or Johannes Brahms, "In a Persian Market" by Albert Ketèlbey, Franz Schubert's "Moments Musicaux" or Schwanengesang, Richard Wagner's "Wesendonck Songs", or Tannhäuser. For comic relief, there was a strolling Oompah Band, the Royal Bavarians, which played songs such as "Lili Marleen", "The Beer Barrel Polka" and Sigmund Romberg's "Heidelberger Trinklied" drinking song from The Student Prince.

Herbert's and Romberg's Viennese counterpart Franz Lehár and his music, including "Dein ist mein ganzes Herz" and the "Merry Widow Waltz" represent the gemütlicher (comfortable and cozy) side of the restaurant's personality. Other musical fare from this branch – The Tales of Hoffmann by Offenbach and Hansel and Gretel by Engelbert Humperdinck, along with the Strauss Waltzes such as "Blue Danube" – made up a good part of the basic Lüchow's repertoire performed by the piano and string ensemble first known as the Vienna Art Strings, or Quartet, and later as the Victor Herbert Quartet, or Trio. Also played during the Christmas season were some of the numbers from Herbert's Babes in Toyland, such as "Toyland" and "March of the Toys", as well as pieces from The Nutcracker, and many popular Christmas carols and songs.

Lüchow’s was referenced on The Danny Thomas Show, originally titled “Make Room for Daddy”, in Season 6, episode 23 that aired on March 9, 1959 where Frankie Laine and Annette Funicello also appeared. Danny invited Frankie to potato pancakes at Lüchow’s.

== Cuisine ==
Lüchow's menu was German-oriented throughout its existence, with dishes including Wiener Schnitzel and various wild game. "Knackwurst and Sauerkraut", Bratwurst, red cabbage and beets, Sauerbraten, their still famous Potato pancakes, and pumpernickel bread were perennial staples. Pfannkuchen mit Preiselbeeren (flambéed thin pancakes with lingonberry sauce) and Sachertorte, a recipe borrowed from the famous Sacher Hotel in Vienna, were favorites of the dessert selection. Apparently the German orientation was relaxed somewhat in the years after 1923 when August Lüchow died, putting the restaurant under control of his sister's husband Victor Eckstein. Even during August Lüchow's lifetime it was necessary to make compromises: during the First World War anti-German sentiment ran so high that by 1917 he thought it prudent to remove the umlaut over the "u" of Lüchow's in all public occurrences of the name.

== Noted guests ==
- Fred Allen
- Jules Bache
- John Barrymore
- Abraham Beame
- Carol Bellamy
- Jack Benny
- Mario Biaggi
- James B. Brady
- James Cagney
- Irving Berlin
- Leonard Bernstein
- David Bowie
- Eddie Cantor
- Andrew Carnegie
- Enrico Caruso
- Dick Cavett
- Walter P. Chrysler
- Bob Considine
- Terrence Cardinal Cooke
- Thomas B. Costain
- Linda Darnell
- Marlene Dietrich
- Mike Douglas
- Theodore Dreiser
- W. E. B. Du Bois
- Antonín Dvořák
- James Montgomery Flagg
- Jane Fonda
- Lillian Gish
- Oscar Hammerstein
- Helen Hayes
- Anna Held
- O. Henry
- Victor Herbert
- James Huneker
- Vincent Impellitteri
- Jacob Javits
- Rafael Joseffy
- Gus Kahn
- George S. Kaufman
- Ed Koch
- Fritz Kreisler
- Alan J. Lerner
- Beatrice Lillie
- Frank Loesser
- Frederick Loewe
- Anita Loos
- O. O. McIntyre
- Norman Mailer
- Dudley Field Malone
- J. P. Marquand
- H. L. Mencken
- J.P. Morgan
- Charles F. Murphy
- Bess Myerson
- George Jean Nathan
- LeRoy Neiman
- Richard M. Nixon
- Ignacy Jan Paderewski
- Dolly Parton
- Adelina Patti
- Anna Pavlova
- I. M. Pei
- Max Perkins
- Cole Porter
- Vincent Price
- Sergei Rachmaninoff
- Kenneth Roberts
- Richard Rodgers
- Sigmund Romberg
- Theodore Roosevelt
- Anton Rubinstein
- Lillian Russell
- Rosalind Russell
- Carl Sandburg
- Mack Sennett
- Jean Shepherd
- Al Smith
- Sigmund Spaeth
- Andrew J. Stein
- William Steinway
- Richard Strauss
- Herbert Bayard Swope
- Lily Tomlin
- Arturo Toscanini
- Helen Traubel
- William Thomas Turner (RMS Lusitania)
- Kurt Vonnegut
- Robert F. Wagner
- Lester Walton
- Jerome Weidman
- Orson Welles
- Henryk Wieniawski
- Charles W. Yost
- Eugène Ysaÿe
- Florenz Ziegfeld
- Efrem Zimbalist

== Literature ==
Lüchow's appears in many non-fiction and fiction books, including La Bonne Table (1964) by Ludwig Bemelmans, Looking for Mr. Goodbar (1975) by Judith Rossner, The Anatolian (1982) by Elia Kazan, My Life as Author and Editor (1993, posthumous) by H. L. Mencken, Sidewalk Critic (1998, posthumous) by Lewis Mumford, and The Stories of John Cheever (2011) by John Cheever.

Mencken wrote, "Nathan and I saw him for the last time at lunch at Lüchow's in June 1920. He looked somewhat thin and pasty, but we ascribed his appearance, not to illness, but to the fact that he was drinking tea. Tea in Lüchow's, the citadel of Pilsner!"
