= Tad's Steaks =

American restaurant chain

- Founded: 1955
- Founder: Donald Townsend
- Website: https://tadssf.com/

Tad's Steaks is a low-cost restaurant, and former chain. The first location, opened in 1955, was at 120 Powell Street in San Francisco. The chain eventually grew to a peak of 28 restaurants, eight of which were in New York. The last location in New York closed in 2019, leaving just the original San Francisco location which has since relocated to 44 Ellis Street, around the corner from the original location. The chain was founded by Donald Townsend and his younger brother Neal. The restaurant's name was inspired by the middle name of Neal's friend and business partner, Alan Tadeus Kay.

The restaurants were set up with a large cooking area at the front, visible though the front window; Townsend called this the "steak show". The meat, marinated in papaya juice to tenderize the inferior cuts used, was cooked over a type of tile invented by the elder Townsend; it was designed to look like charcoal, but was cleaner and easier to regulate.

To save on costs, the restaurants did not have waiters; the customers took their food to tables on trays. The chain further reduced expenses by relying on word-of-mouth for publicity instead of advertising. In 1957, a meal of a T-bone steak with garlic bread, a baked potato, and a salad cost $1.09. In 1989, an entrée ranged from $2.99 to $6.99.

== Founders ==
Tad's was founded in 1955 (some sources say 1954 or 1957) by Donald Townsend, whom Fortune called "the grandfather of the fast foods business". Townsend was born on June 20, 1908, on his parents' ranch near Medora, North Dakota. His father had been born Albert Sampson and took the last name of Townsend later in life. His mother, Lydia, was the daughter of North Dakota rancher and politician Donald Stevenson. It is unclear how many children Albert and Lydia had: The New York Times reported that Townsend was the oldest of five children, but The Bismarck Tribune stated he was the eldest of four sons and seven children total.

In 1923, Townsend's family moved to Pullman, Washington, where he initially worked as a logger. He moved into the food industry after being injured, opening a hot dog stand in Pullman and several diners in Seattle, and then taking a job with Borden in California. He and his brother Neal, seven years his junior, ran a number of coffee shops, dairy bars, and fast food diners, the latter reported to be the first of their kind in the country. They eventually started the Cameos chain.

In 1954, Neal and his friend Alan Tadeus Kay obtained a loan to open the first Tad's on Powell Street in San Francisco, using Kay's middle name as inspiration for the restaurant's. Donald is said to have made the restaurant a success, contributing his business expertise. By 1957, the Townsends felt the restaurant was ready to expand into a chain and opened their second location, on 42nd Street in New York, near Times Square. This proved to be a success and they proceeded to open other locations; within a few years, there were 28 locations including eight in New York.

Alan Kay died not long after the Powell Street location opened. Neal Townsend died in 1998. Donald died on March 25th, 2000, at the age of 91.

== Sale to the Riese Organization ==
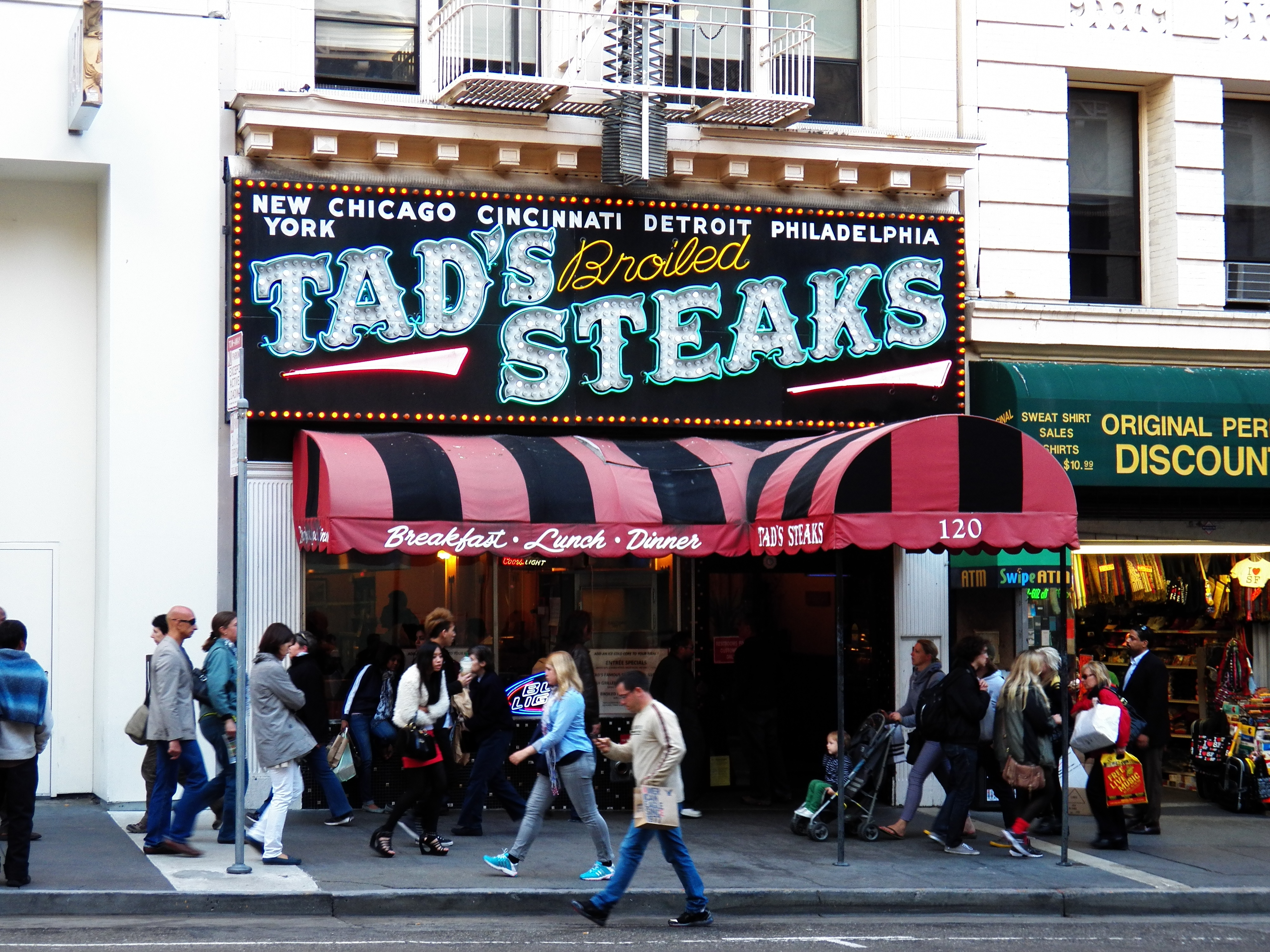
Tad's Steaks, 120 Powell Street, San Francisco

The chain was bought by the Riese Organization in 1988. In 1986, the Townsends had decided to sell the company and began negotiating with several potential buyers. At the time, the Townsends had a controlling interest in the company, owning 72.6% of the common stock. They were asking $12 million, to which Riese countered with an offer of $11 million, plus an additional $1 million to be paid to each brother over five years for consulting services under a non-compete agreement. The 1987 stock market crash led to the deal being renegotiated to $9.75 million before it could close, with the $2 million consulting agreement remaining intact. After selling the business, Townsend moved to Reno, Nevada to be with his family.

A lawsuit from minority shareholders was filed, claiming that the Townsends unfairly negotiated the deal to their exclusive benefit. The claim was upheld with a judgment in favor of the plaintiffs for approximately $0.75 million plus interest and costs.

By 2004, the 42nd Street location was closed, leaving three restaurants in Manhattan, with Riese planning to open a new location in Fulton Mall, Brooklyn. The last New York location was at 761 Seventh Avenue, near Times Square.

The San Francisco location was bought in 2000 by brothers Phineas and Stephen Ng. Their mother, Nancy Ng, had previously owned three restaurants in San Francisco. The Ngs lost the lease for the original Powell Street location and moved around the corner to Ellis Street. The Ellis Street location was new construction, but they kept the old Powell Street sign and reused it on Ellis Street when it opened in March 2020.

== Media commentary ==
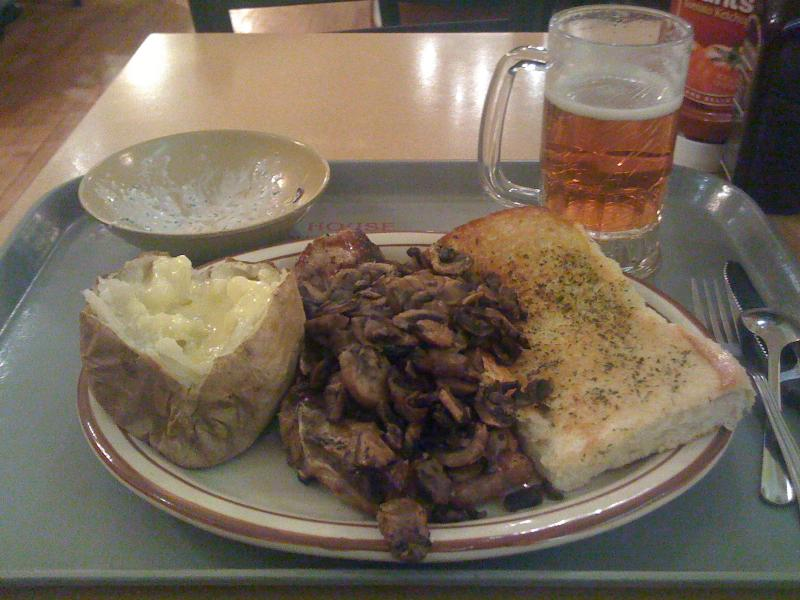
A typical meal at Tad's

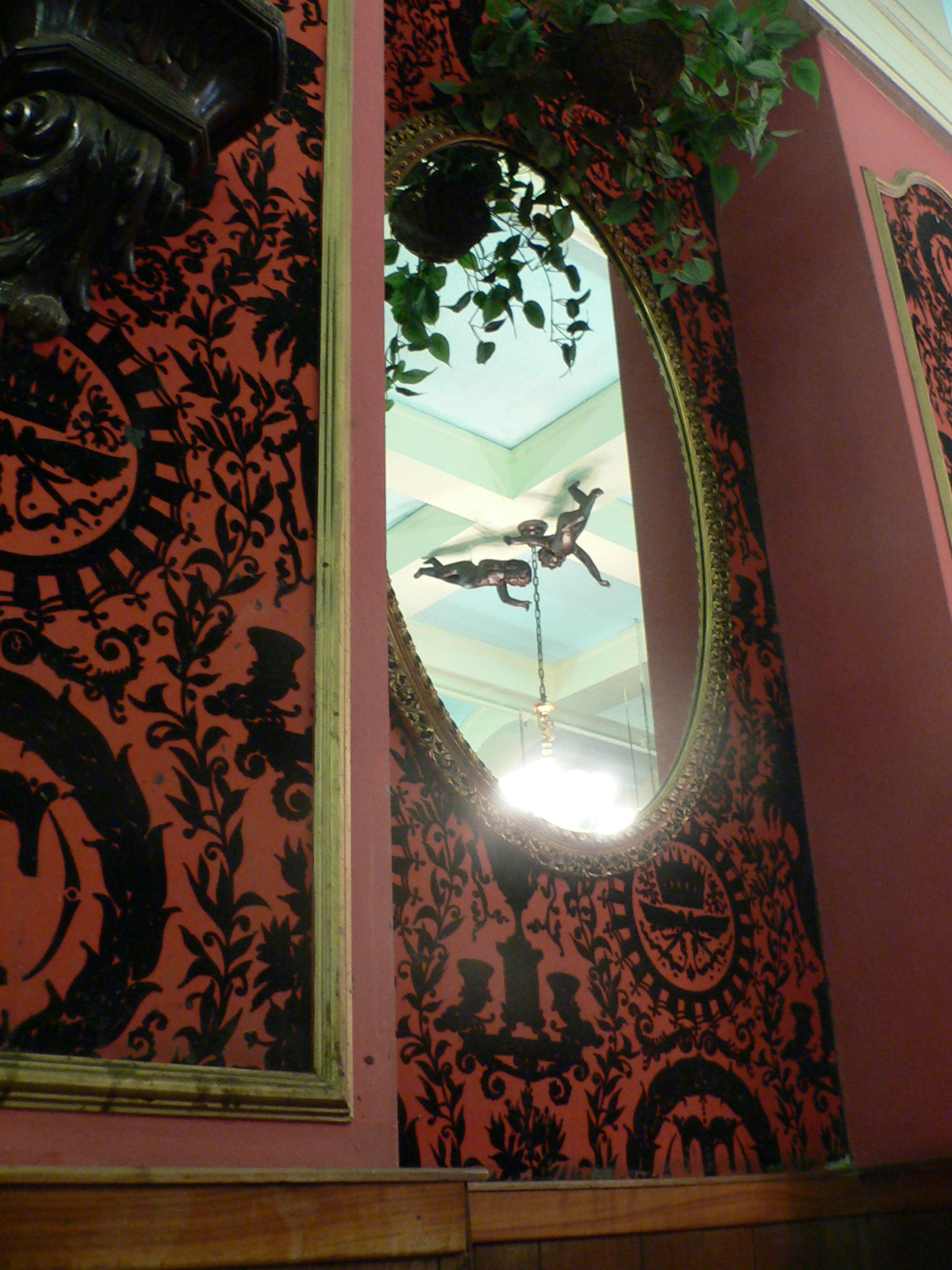
Interior showing red wallpaper.

Warren Shoulberg of Forbes described Tad's as "a step-up from the fast food world" and "among the first players in what is now called fast casual dining". But, wrote Shoulberg, they failed to keep up with the changing times and lost their place to competitors such as Outback, Red Lobster, Chili's, and Panera as well as services such as GrubHub, Uber Eats, and Postmates, which do home delivery of restaurant meals. He described the chain as having become "increasingly irrelevant" and "an anachronism with its red velvet walls, fake Tiffany lamps, and overall garish demeanor".

In 1989, Spy magazine ran a satirical review of six Tad's locations in New York (105 East 14th Street, 265 West 34th Street, 119 West 42nd Street, 228 West 42nd Street, 707 Seventh Avenue, and 152 West 34th Street), which characterized the chain as "Tasty Food, Low Prices, Service With a Grunt". Robert Brenner of Untapped New York described the interior decoration as "bordello-esque – red flocked wallpaper, fake Tiffany lamps" and noted that the "service was indifferent", with food served cafeteria style. Steve Rushin, in his memoir Nights in White Castle, compares the ambiance of Tad's, along with the Blarney Stone chain of bars and the Port Authority Bus Terminal, to White Castle hamburger shops. Kathleen Doherty, in her Walking San Francisco guidebook, wrote that the Powell Street location, "with its gaudy sign looking like a holdover from the vaudeville era, still purveys shoe-leather cuts, charbroiled and served over the counter".

Colin Dodds of the Gothamist reminisced in 2015, when there was just a single Tad's left in New York, about how little the restaurant had changed since the 1990s, despite the city having done so. Mushrooms or onions on the steak were available, although customer's wouldn't be advised of the extra cost when they ordered them. And while a salad was included in the cost of the meal, tomatoes on the salad were an additional charge. Dodds characterized these hidden upcharges as "the short con", in contrast to "the long con" perpetuated by more pretentious restaurants: that their upscale dining experience with "artisan anything" would "impart sophistication, instill morality, and forestall death". Wine was available, offered pre-poured into glasses covered with saran wrap and available for self-service by customers as they proceeded down the cafeteria-style line to the cashier. Also available were cups of green Jell-O, displayed on trays of ice. Despite these complaints, Dodd wrote fondly of being able to eat in solitude, unbothered by wait staff.

In a 2023 podcast retrospective three years after the last Tad's in New York closed, Peter Romeo said that "the concept seems to have faded from the memories of New Yorkers and restaurateurs alike ... Tad's was in many respects, an unappreciated pioneer". Romeo compared the Tad's business model to that of latter-day Chipotle or Wendy's; by minimizing labor costs, having a limited menu, buying lower-cost cuts of meat, and anticipating customer demand, they were able to offer a meal at rock-bottom prices and still make a profit. According to Romeo, the chain had "A New York City vibe" and developed a "cult following".

== Additional reading ==
- Austin, Ben (February 17, 2003). "Tad's Steaks Runs Times Square with a Fist of Broiled Fury". Columbia Daily Spectator.
