= Longchamps (restaurant chain) =

20th-century restaurant chain in New York City

- Industry: Restaurant
- Founded: 1919
- Defunct: mid-1970s
- Headquarters: New York, Washington, D.C.
- Number of locations: At least 20
- Key people: Henry Lustig (founder), Jan Mitchell, Riese Brothers, Larry Ellman

Longchamps was a chain of several upscale restaurants centered in Manhattan that consisted of twenty or more locations at its peak, including the Showboat Restaurant located in the Empire State Building. The chain's first location was opened in 1919. Longchamps restaurants were known for their natty art deco furnishings and decorations by Winold Reiss, and a number of designs for elements of their physical surroundings were drawn up by New York architect Ely Jacques Kahn, originator of a colorful version of art deco architecture.

In the early 1960s, Longchamps was the first – and perhaps the only – restaurant to introduce complementary Metrecal at luncheon, and was otherwise known for such specialties as Oxtail Ragout, Crabmeat a la Dewey, Nesselrode Pie, and "21-Percent Butterfat Ice Cream". A Longchamps in Washington D.C. was among the first tablecloth restaurants there to allow black customers.

In 1959, restaurateur Jan Mitchell, the owner of Luchow's, became president and majority owner of the chain. In 1967, with a total of eight locations existing in Manhattan at that point, he sold a controlling stake to Murray and Irving Riese. Restaurateur Larry Ellman, owner of the Cattleman Restaurant, soon became partners with the Rieses and was named president of the chain.

In 1971, the chain sold four of its remaining restaurants to the Riese Organization, also controlled by the Riese brothers, mostly removing it from the "white tablecloth" restaurant business, and a number of the old locations had been turned into steakhouse-themed outlets. In June 1975, the former parent company, Longchamps, Inc., filed for bankruptcy.
