= Donald Stevenson =

American politician

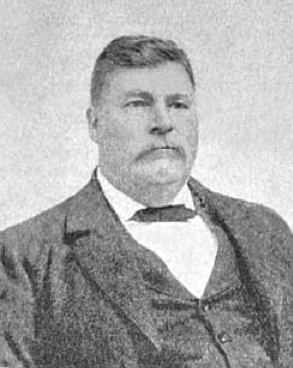
Donald Stevenson

Donald Stevenson (April 12, 1833 - 1908) was a cattleman and politician in North Dakota, US. A state assemblyman, he was also the first elected Emmons County treasurer.

== Early years ==
He was born in the Scottish Highlands, came to British North America in 1833, was educated in the common schools of that country, and settled in Douglas County, Minnesota.

== Career ==
Stevenson came to the Red River Valley long in advance of any of the settlements, excepting that at Pembina and Walhalla long before Bismarck, Fargo, Wahpeton or Grand Forks had any inhabitants. He was at Pembina in 1863, engaged as an army freighter in charge of a train of 300 wagons with supplies for Hatch's battalion. The old ox yokes and chains found by early settlers in Ransom County were remains of his train, lost in freighting to old Fort Ransom in 1868.

He was an army contractor at old Fort Abercrombie and located at Bismarck in 1872, engaging in contracting at Fort Rice, Fort Abraham Lincoln, Fort Stevenson and Ford Berthold, and also at Fort Keogh, Fort Custer, Fort Buford and other points in the Northwest, long before the days of railroad extensions. In 1877, he put in 3,800 tons of hay at Fort Keogh in 64 days at $28 per ton. His hay and wood contracts at that time amounted to US $104,000. In 1876, he was engaged in freighting to the Black Hills and arrived at Big Meadow just after Billy Budge's battle with the Sioux. Retiring from contracting and freighting, Stevenson became a cattle grower, having a herd of several hundred cattle west of the Missouri, southwest of Mandan. In 1806, was appointed postmaster at Osakis, Minnesota by Abraham Lincoln, was county commissioner for seven years in Douglas county, and two years in Emmons County, North Dakota, and then served as postmaster. He was a member of the 1897 North Dakota Legislative Assembly.

He was inducted into the North Dakota Cowboy Hall of Fame in 2007.
