= List of pilots awarded an Aviator's Certificate by the Royal Aero Club in 1911 =

The Royal Aero Club issued Aviators Certificates from 1910. These were internationally recognised under the Fédération Aéronautique Internationale.

== List ==
Aviator's Certificates awarded
in 1910 (1–38)	in 1911 (39–168)	in 1912 (169–382)	in 1913 (383–719)	in 1914 (720–1032)

Legend

Individual was killed in an aviation accident.
Individual was killed flying in military action.

Royal Aero Club certificates awarded in 1911 (nos. 39–168)
No.	Name	Date	Comment	
39	Bethell Godefroy Bouwens	7 January 1911	Author of several books on the subject of genealogy.	
40	Lt. George Bayard Hynes RGA	7 January 1911	Awarded the DSO during service with the Royal Flying Corps during the first world war, retired as a Royal Air Force Group Captain in 1931 and became the deputy director of aeronautical inspection in the Air Ministry.	
41	St. Croix Johnstone	7 January 1911	Killed 16 August 1911 when his Moisant monoplane crashed into Lake Michigan while he was taking part in the 1911 Chicago International Aviation Meet.	
42	Henry Cook	7 January 1911	He was awarded Royal Aero Club Special Certificate No. 7 for carrying out a series flights and aerial manoeuvres which were of special merit in the early years of aviation.	
43	Basil Herbert Barrington-Kennett	7 January 1911	(1884–1915). A Lieutenant in the Grenadier Guards, he used a Bleriot Monoplane at Hendon. He "was seconded to the Air Battalion of the Royal Engineers, the forerunner of the Royal Flying Corps, which came into being in April, 1912. He went to France with the R.F.C. in 1914, but in 1915 he returned to his regiment and was killed in action at Festubert" (France) on 18 May 1915. He is buried at Le Touret Military Cemetery. Three of the four brothers were killed in the Great War (see entry: No. 190).	
44	Paul Georges Leon Jezzi	7 January 1911	Leo Jezzi was an aircraft designer; named on Eastchurch memorial to Pioneer Aviators. Built two aircraft of his own design at Eastchurch.	
45	Lt. Reginald Archibald Cammell, RE	7 January 1911	He died 17 September 1911 when he crashed in an ASL Valkyrie which had been recently been given to the Army. He was one of only three officers in the Air Battalion, Royal Engineers who qualified in all forms of aircraft: balloons (Airship Certificate No. 1), man-lifting kites and aeroplanes.	
46	Oscar Colin Morison	17 January 1911	An engineer, he used a Bleriot Monoplane at Brooklands. Died in 1966.	
47	James Valentine	17 January 1911	Used a Macfie Biplane at Brooklands: Valentine died following an operation as a Lt.-Col. in the Royal Flying Corps on 7 August 1917 at Kieff in Russia (now Kyiv in Ukraine). One of only four airmen who completed the 1911 Circuit of Britain and the only British aviator to complete the whole course of the European circuit. For these achievements he was awarded the Silver Medal of the R.Ae.C. in 1912 Valentine was awarded the second R.Ae.C. Special certificate on 6 December 1911;	
48	Henry J. Delaval Astley	24 January 1911	Died flying a Blériot in an exhibition Flight in Belfast on 21 September 1912.	
49	Robert Francis Macfie	24 January 1911	Aircraft designer and constructor (e.g. the Macfie Monoplane); sometimes credited with the invention of the 'tank' (i.e. the armoured vehicle with caterpillar tracks); he was a member of the British Landships Committee.	
50	Cecil Howard Pixton	24 January 1911	Winner of the 1914 Schneider Trophy in a Sopwith Tabloid floatplane; founder of the AVRO flying school at Brooklands.	
51	Herbert John Thomas	24 January 1911	Born 1892, at the time he was the youngest pilot to have been awarded the Aviator's Certificate. He was a founding member of the British and Colonial Aeroplane Company, formed 1910, and stayed with the company under its various names until his death following surgery in 1947, at which time he was assistant managing director of the Bristol Aeroplane Company. He had also served as chairman and council member of the Society of British Aerospace Companies.	
52	Sir Ellis "Victor" Sassoon (announced under the name E."Smith")	24 January 1911	3rd (and last) Baronet Sassoon.	
53	Geoffrey de Havilland	7 February 1911	Aviation pioneer, designer, founder of de Havilland Aircraft Company; he received the R.Ae.C. Special Certificate no. 4 on 9 Jan. 1912.	
54	Captain Daniel Goodwin Conner RFC	7 February 1911	Capt. Conner was a flight commander in No. 5 Squadron RFC and later, as temporary major, squadron commander. A photograph of Lt. Conner appeared in Flight Magazine's "Aviation Pioneers" series in its issue dated 4 March 1911.	
55	James Vernon Martin	7 February 1911	Martin was an American citizen and inventor, who took out many aeronautical patents, including an "automatic stabilizer (1916) and retractable landing gear (1916)".	
56	Arthur Haynes Aitken	14 February 1911	Flight Roll of Honour: Reported missing on 11 November 1918: Aitken, Sec. Lieut. A.H.	
57	Charles L A Hubert	14 February 1911	French aviator, born 16 March 1889; took part in the King George V Coronation (airmail) flights from Hendon, where he crashed his Farman III and broke both legs.	
58	George Henry Challenger	14 February 1911	Elected "Associate Fellow of the Royal Aeronautical Society" in 1913, chief designer and engineer in the aviation department of Vickers; formerly chief engineer at the British and Colonial Aeroplane Company, and previously employed as an engineer by the Bristol Tramways and Carriage Co. Challenger was the author and co-author of numerous patents, including those for a ring mounting and the Vickers-Challenger interrupter gear, both for machine-guns.	
59	George Richard Sutton Darroch	14 February 1911	Blériot school, Hendon. 22 Feb. 1880, d. 3 Dec. 1959; went to Eton College; was an apprentice at the London & North Western Railway (LNWR) in Crewe; fought in World War I, being awarded the Croix de Guerre; returned to work in Crewe, eventually becoming Assistant Works Manager with the LNWR and its successor, the London, Midland and Scottish Railway; retired in 1941. During his first employment in Crewe he designed and supervised the construction of the "Orion", a one-sixth scale model Webb Compound locomotive now maintained and operated by the Stephenson Locomotive Society.	
60	Archibald Knight	14 February 1911	at Bristol Flying School, Brooklands; instructor at the Vickers Flying School; joined the RFC in 1914; recalled to join Maxwell Muller in managing the Vickers works at Weybridge as works manager until his retirement 1936; returned in 1939 to manage Wellington and Warwick repair.	
61	Collyns Price Pizey	14 February 1911	Used a Bristol Biplane at Salisbury Plain. Later chief instructor at Bristol's Brooklands school. Died of dysentery in Greece 11 June 1915. He was a Flt. Lt. in the Royal Naval Air Service working for the British Naval Mission to Greece.	
62	Louis Maron	14 February 1911	A French aviator who used a Bristol Biplane at Salisbury Plain.	
63	William Hugh Ewen	14 February 1911	Scottish aviator who used a Bleriot Monoplane at Hendon. Performed the first flight across the Firth of Forth in 1911. At the end of 1911, he contacted the Caudron Brothers at Rue and his company, W.H. Ewen Aviation Co Ltd, Hendon, became the registered agent for the construction and sale of Caudron aeroplanes in the British Empire. Founded the Ewen Flying School at Hendon in 1912. Served in the Royal Flying Corps and Royal Air Force, reaching the rank of Major, resigning his commission due to ill health in 1918. He died in 1947. Ewen was also an organist and conductor (he composed the "Zephyr Waltz"), and appeared in the 1913 aviation film Through the Clouds.	
64	Gustav Hamel	14 February 1911	Holder of the French aviator's certificate no. 358; he disappeared over the English Channel on 23 May 1914 while returning from Paris in a new 80 hp Morane-Saulnier monoplane he had just collected. At this time of high international tension, there was speculation that he might have been the victim of sabotage, but no trace was ever found.	
65	Quinto Poggioli	28 February 1911	Italian aviator used a Bleriot Monoplane at the New Forest Aviation School, Beaulieu.	
66	Lewis William Francis Turner	4 April 1911	Used a Farman Biplane at Hendon. Served with the Royal Flying Corps during the First World War.	
67	Waldo Ridley Prentice	25 April 1911	14 August 1883-18 January 1952; Used a Farman Biplane at Hendon to gain his certificate. Flew for Aeronautical Syndicate Limited until it closed in 1912 and became involved with British Anzani. Due to heart problems he didn't fly much and spent over thirty years in the diplomatic service.	
68	Eric C. Gordon England	25 April 1911	One of the early pioneers of gliding.	
69	Henry R. Fleming	25 April 1911	–	
70	Charles Cyril Turner	25 April 1911	Author of "The Old Flying Days".	
71	Lt. Charles Rumney Samson RN	25 April 1911	Samson was the first pilot to take off from a moving ship, and was instrumental in the development of aerial wireless communications, bomb- and torpedo-dropping, navigational techniques and night flying.	
72	Lt. Arthur M. Longmore RN	25 April 1911	Later Air Chief Marshal Sir Arthur Longmore RAF; named on Eastchurch memorial to Pioneer Aviators.	
73	Lt. Wilfred Parke RN	25 April 1911	Gained his certificate at Brooklands in a Bristol Boxkite on his fourth flight. Known for the 'Parke Dive' spin-recovery on 25 August 1912; crashed and died near Wembley 15 December 1912 with Mr Arkell Hardwick of Handley Page.	
74	Francis Conway Jenkins CBE	2 May 1911	b. 1888, d. 1933; raced cars at Brooklands; took part in the Circuit of Britain Air Race; rose from 2nd. Lt. to Brigadier-General (RAF), Director of Parks and Depots, Air Ministry; he resigned his commission and became a director of The British Motor Trading Corporation (founded 1919).	
75	Lt. Reginald Gregory RN	2 May 1911	Named on Eastchurch memorial to Pioneer Aviators.	
76	Lt. Eugene Louis Gerrard RMLI	2 May 1911	Named on Eastchurch memorial to Pioneer Aviators.	
77	Edward Victor Beauchamp Fisher	2 May 1911	On 13 May 1912 Fisher was piloting a Green powered Flanders monoplane with an American passenger Mr. Mason when it crashed at Brooklands killing them both.	
78	Hubert Oxley	9 May 1911	Chief Flying Instructor at Filey, Yorkshire; died 6 December 1911, together with his passenger, Mr. Weiss: during a steep dive in a Blackburn Mercury, fabric tore off the wings and the plane crashed, killing both Oxley and Weiss.	
79	Harold Blackburn	9 May 1911	Demonstration pilot for Robert Blackburn. Won the Wars of the Roses air race on 2 October 1913 and piloted the first scheduled airline flights in Great Britain on 22 July 1914. Served with the RFC in France and Palestine. Retired from the RAF in 1929.	
80	Ronald C. Kemp	9 May 1911	Test pilot for Short Brothers; was injured (and his passenger Ewart Temple Haynes killed) in a crash at Brooklands on 23 February 1914.	
81	R. W. Philpott	9 May 1911	–	
82	Wilfred Herbert Dolphin	9 May 1911	Used a Hanriot Monoplane at Brooklands, an Automobile Engineer born in Birmingham on 8 May 1882, later served with the Royal Flying Corps.	
83	C. H. Marks	9 May 1911	–	
84	Capt. Seaton Dunham Massy	9 May 1911	Flew with the Air Battalion during 1911, and was commandant of the Indian Central Flying School at Sitapur.	–
85	F. P. Raynham	9 May 1911	1893–1954	
86	James L. Travers, Jr.	16 May 1911	Named on Eastchurch memorial to Pioneer Aviators; named on Eastchurch memorial to Pioneer Aviators. 'Jack' Travers was a draughtsman at Short Brothers and later also a flying instructor at Eastchurch.	
87	Edward Hotchkiss	16 May 1911	Killed on 10 September 1912, together with his passenger, Lt. C. A. Bettington (granted his Aviator's certificate, No. 256, on 24 July 1912) when his Bristol Monoplane crashed due to the failure of a quick-release cable fitment, which caused the fabric of the starboard wing to fail.	
88	T. C. R. Higgins	16 May 1911	Commanded the RFC's Home Defence Brigade during World War I, retired as an air commodore in 1929.	
89	Lt. W. D. Beatty RE	30 May 1911	–	
90	Lt. R. B. Davies RN	30 May 1911	Awarded Victoria Cross for actions during Dardanelles Campaign. Retired as Vice-admiral in 1941	
91	Bentfield Charles Hucks	30 May 1911	Test flights at Filey, Yorkshire using a Blackburn monoplane. Died from pneumonia 6 November 1918. Was a captain in the Royal Air Force when he died, the first Englishman to loop and fly upside down. The Hucks starter, an essential vehicle on Great War aerodromes, was named after him.	
92	Captain Herbert Ramsay Playford Reynolds RE	6 June 1911	Royal Flying Corps, test flights at Salisbury Plain using a Bristol Biplane.	
93	Thomas Henry Sebag-Montefiore	13 June 1911	–	
94	H. R. Busteed	13 June 1911	The first Australian to hold a pilot's licence. Later an RAF air commodore.	
95	Frederick Sykes	20 June 1911	Senior RFC commander and second Chief of the Air Staff.	
96	G. Higginbotham	27 June 1911	–	
97	Herbert Stanley-Adams	27 June 1911	–	
98	Lt. J. W. Pepper RA	27 June 1911	–	
99	Henry Salmet	27 June 1911	–	
100	Charles Gordon Bell	4 July 1911	First professional test pilot (at Short Brothers); having been invalided out of military service in World War I, Bell died Monday, 29 July 1918, test flying for Vickers Ltd.	
101	Charles Reginald Abbott	4 July 1911	–	
102	William Miller Hilliard	4 July 1911	–	
103	William Darnley Johnstone	4 July 1911	1889–1912 Died at the Minster Infirmary, Sheppey, aged 23 on 15 June 1912 following a motor-cycle accident.	
104	Gerald Francis Napier	18 July 1911	Awarded after a flight at Brooklands in a Bristol Biplane. On 1 August 1911, aged 19, he lost control during a flight at Brooklands and was killed; his passenger was thrown clear and survived.	
105	Lt. Thomas Gerard Hetherington	18 July 1911	1886–1951, became one of the first members of the Royal Flying Corps in 1912 and retired in 1935 as a Group Captain.	
106	Cecil Lawrence Pashley	18 July 1911	–	
107	Henry De Grey Warter	18 July 1911	Born 20 July 1885 at Kirkee, Bombay, India; Lieutenant, later Captain, 4th Dragoon Guards; served with his cavalry regiment in First World War and killed in action at Battle of Cambrai (1917).	
108	Capt. C. Robert Brooke-Popham	18 July 1911	–	
109	Harry Bingham Brown	1 August 1911	–	
110	Evelyn Frederick Driver	1 August 1911	South African born aviator used a Farman Biplane at Hendon for certificate flights.	
111	Norman Scott Percival	1 August 1911	–	
112	Walter Oswald Watt	1 August 1911	–	
113	Walter Lawrence	1 August 1911	–	
114	George Miller Dyott	17 August 1911	–	
115	Lt. Col. Charles Oswald Smeaton	17 August 1911	-	
116	Louis Noel	17 August 1911	–	
117	Lt. Spenser Douglas Adair Grey RN	17 August 1911	Used a Farman biplane at Brooklands. Served with the Royal Naval Air Service during the first world war being awarded the Distinguished Service Order and the American Navy Distinguished Service Medal. Left with the rank of Lt Col. He died in 1937 when he fell off the roof of his flat in London.	
118	Brig. Gen. Colonel D Henderson CB, DSO	17 August 1911	Gained his certificate at Brooklands in Bristol Boxkite after less tham a weeks instruction.	
119	Theodore John Ridge	17 August 1911	Assistant Superintendent of the Royal Aircraft Factory – killed 18 August 1911 in crash of Royal Aircraft Factory S.E.1.	
120	Carl Olaf Dahlbeck	29 August 1911	Swedish aviator, used a Farman Biplane at Hendon.	
121	Lt. L.V. Stewart Blacker	29 August 1911	Joint organizer and chief observer on first flight over Mount Everest in 1933.	
122	Mrs. Hilda Beatrice Hewlett	29 August 1911	The first British woman to receive a pilot's certificate, gained flying her Farman biplane. Opened a flying school at Brooklands with Gustav Blondeau and an aircraft company with him. She taught her son, Francis Hewlett (certificate 156), to fly.	
123	Walter C. England	29 August 1911	–	
124	Herbert Spencer	29 August 1911	Described as an Aviator/Aero Engineer he obtained licence on a biplane he had built himself.	
125	Capt. Captain D. Le Geyt Pitcher	29 August 1911	–	
126	Capt. C. G. Hoare	29 August 1911	–	
127	Lt. Robert Hamilton Clark-Hall RN	29 August 1911	Later Air Marshal Sir Robert Clark-Hall RAF (and Air Commodore RNZAF 1943–45).	
128	Henry Aloysius Petre	12 September 1911	Henry Aloysius Petre DSO, MC, was an English solicitor who became Australia's first military aviator, and a founding member of the Australian Flying Corps, predecessor of the Royal Australian Air Force.	
129	William E. Gibson	12 September 1911	–	
130	E. W. Copland Perry	12 September 1911	–	
131	Eric Harrison	12 September 1911	–	
132	Samuel Pepys Cockerell	12 September 1911	1881–1915 Part of the Cambridge University crew for the 1900 Boat Race. Died in service with the Royal Flying Corps in Egypt in 1915.	
133	R. O. Crawshay	12 September 1911	–	
134	R. O. Abercromby	12 September 1911	–	
135	Lt. G. J. E. Manisty	12 September 1911	–	
136	John Brereton	19 September 1911	–	
137	Albert Hunter	19 September 1911	–	
138	Alfred Dunkinfield Jones	19 September 1911	–	
139	Eric Clowes Pashley	26 September 1911	–	
140	John Lewis Longstaffe	26 September 1911	(see Flight 29 March 1912, see also The Daily Journal and Tribune, Knoxville, Tennessee: 29 September 1912)	
141	Lt. A. Wyness Stuart RA	26 September 1911	Died in a crash in Deperdussin Monoplane 100 Gnome No. 258, piloted by Capt. P. Hamilton, at Graveley, near Stevenage, on 6 September 1912. The accident was considered to have been caused by "a part of the engine coming off and hitting the bonnet over the engine, smashing one of the wing wires, and thus loosening the wings".	
142	Capt. Frederick William Richey	3 October 1911	1875–1934 Royal Artillery officer who became an instructor at the Central Flying School and served with the Royal Flying Corps until January 1917 when he returned to his regiment. In 1915–16 he was commanding officer of 21 Squadron.	
143	Capt. Steele Hutcheson	3 October 1911	1880–1954 Indian Army seconded to the Royal Flying Corps during the First World War.	
144	Capt. Cyril L. N. Newall	3 October 1911	–	
145	Lt. E. J. Strover	10 October 1911	An officer in the Burma Rifles served with the Royal Flying Corps during the First World War.	
146	Lionel Seymour Metford	17 October 1911	1888–1950 Served with the Royal Flying Corps/Royal Air Force, died in Canada.	
147	William Barnard Rhodes-Moorhouse	17 October 1911	Rhodes-Moorhouse was the first airman to be awarded the VC. He died from injuries sustained from small-arms fire during an aerial attack on a railway junction at Kortrijk, Belgium on 26 April 1915.	
148	Zee Yee Lee	17 October 1911	Chinese aviator who used a Bristol Biplane at Salisbury Plain.	
149	Lt. Alexander Francis Anderson Hooper	24 October 1911	Used a Bristol biplane at Salisbury Plain. Born at Starcross in Devon on 5 June 1885. He was a lieutenant in the Prince of Wales's (North Staffordshire Regiment), a Squadron Leader in the Royal Air Force in 1920, and a Wing Commander in 1928. Died in 1977 in Devon.	
150	Lt. Edward Guy Kynaston Cross	24 October 1911	Used a Bristol biplane at the Bristol School, Salisbury Plain. Born in Bolton 23 November 1884. He was a lieutenant in the 7th Hussars in 1911, later a lieutenant-colonel. Died 15 November 1969.	
151	Frank Martin Ballard	31 October 1911	1885–1956 Served with the Royal Flying Corps and Royal Air Force during the first world war.	
152	Lt. Henry Harold Harford	7 November 1911	Used a Bristol biplane at Brooklands, a lieutenant in the Royal Field Artillery in 1911. He was born in Lahore, India on 1 January 1887.	
153	Mrs. Cheridah de Beauvoir Stocks	7 November 1911	Licence test flights at Hendon using a Farman biplane, the second British woman to hold a licence. Gave up flying following a serious flying accident at Hendon in 1913.	
154	Eustace B. Loraine	7 November 1911	Died in a crash in a Nieuport 70 Gnome Monoplane on Salisbury Plain 5 July 1912, the first R.F.C. officer to die in this way; Staff-Sergeant R. H. V. Wilson, his passenger, also died in the crash.	
155	Oswald Lawrence Mellersh	14 November 1911	1892–1974 Moved to Canada in 1925	
156	Sub.-Lt. Francis Esmé Theodore Hewlett RN	14 November 1911	Used a Farman Biplane at Brooklands. Son of the first woman to hold a licence, Hilda Hewlett. Took part in the Cuxhaven Raid in 1914. Transferred to the Royal Air Force and then Royal New Zealand Air Force.	
157	Robert Bertram Slack	14 November 1911	1886–1913 A former chauffeur from Nottingham before becoming an aviator, he died in a motoring accident on 21 December 1913, aged 28.	
158	Captain Richard Scorer Molyneux Harrison	14 November 1911	A Captain with the 51st Sikhs (Frontier Force), used a Bristol Biplane at Brooklands. Killed in action 16 August 1915 during the Gallipoli campaign.	
159	Captain Clement Robert Wedgwood Allen, Welch Regiment	14 November 1911	Used a Bristol Biplane at Brooklands for certificate. Died in an aircraft accident 11 March 1914.	
160	H. A. Williamson	28 November 1911	–	
161	Robert Smith-Barry	28 November 1911	–	
162	George Bentley Dacre	28 November 1911	RNAS pilot and prisoner of war during World War I, senior RAF commander during World War II.	
163	Lt. John Graham Bower RN	28 November 1911	1886–1940 Awarded the Distinguished Service Order in 1918 for service in submarines.	
164	James Arthur Anderson	28 November 1911	1886–? Served in the Royal Naval Air Service and Royal Air Force during the First World War.	
165	Maj. Reginald Limond Benwell	6 December 1911	1870–1934 Indian Army, later a Lieutenant-Colonel, imported the first aircraft into India.	
166	Capt. Robert Gordon	6 December 1911	–	
167	James Denys Perceval Chataway	12 December 1911	1892–1953 Used a Deperdussin Monoplane at the Deperdussin School, Brooklands. He was appointed an OBE in 1948 when he was a Principal in the Board of Trade.	
168	Charles Ferris Montagu Chambers	12 December 1911	1892–1947 Born in South Africa. Used a Valkyrie Monoplane at Hendon. Served in the Royal Flying Corps and Royal Naval Air Service during the First World War. Awarded the Distinguished Service Cross in 1917. He committed suicide in Brighton in 1947.	

== See also ==
Lists for other years:

- 1910
- 1911
- 1912
- 1913
- 1914
- List of pilots with foreign Aviator's Certificates accredited by the Royal Aero Club 1910-1914

== Bibliography ==
- Barnes, C.H.; D.N. James (1989). Shorts Aircraft since 1900. London: Putnam. p. 560. ISBN 0-85177-819-4.
- Jackson, A.J. (1987). De Havilland Aircraft since 1908. London: Putnam. ISBN 0-85177-802-X.
- Jarrett, Philip (2002). "Making Flying Safer". In Jarrett, Philip (ed.). Pioneer Aircraft:Early Aviation before 1914. London: Putnam. pp. 202–215. ISBN 0-85177-869-0.
