= Dyott Bomber =

General information
- Type: Bomber
- National origin: United Kingdom
- Manufacturer: Hewlett & Blondeau
- Designer: George Miller Dyott
- Number built: 2

History
- First flight: August 1916

The Dyott Bomber was a prototype twin-engined British biplane bomber aircraft of the First World War. Two examples were built but the type was not adopted for service.

== Design and development ==
The American aviation pioneer George Dyott learned to fly in 1911, and after an extensive tour of North America, designed a small single-seat monoplane, the Dyott monoplane, which he had built by Hewlett & Blondeau of London in early 1913. In 1914, Dyott designed a large twin-engined biplane for exploration in South Africa. The design and its potential for use as a long-range bomber attracted the attention of the British Royal Naval Air Service, and Dyott modified the design for military use, with an order for two prototypes placed with Hewlett & Blondeau.

As completed the Dyott Bomber was a four-bay tractor biplane with equal-span wings. It was powered by two Beardmore 120 hp water-cooled six-cylinder engines which were mounted, without cowlings, between the wings. The aircraft had a fixed nosewheel undercarriage, with the nosewheel balanced by a large tailskid. It carried a crew of three, with a pilot and two gunners, in nose and dorsal positions.

The first prototype, serial number 3687, made its maiden flight at Chingford in August 1916, with the second prototype, serial number 3688 following in September. It proved to be underpowered and was fitted with 230 horsepower (170 kW) BHP engines, while the forward fuselage was deepened. Armament was increased to five Lewis guns, with two on spigot mounts in the nose gunners cockpit, two firing through the ports in the side of the nose and one in the rear gunners cockpit. The second prototype was sent to Dunkerque in France for service trials but no production followed.

== Specifications (approximate) ==
Data from The British Bomber since 1914

General characteristics

- Crew: 3
- Length: 45 ft 3 in (13.79 m)
- Wingspan: 70 ft 6 in (21.49 m)
- Height: 12 ft (3.7 m)
- Wing area: 800 sq ft (74 m^{2})
- Gross weight: 7,800 lb (3,538 kg)
- Powerplant: 2 × Beardmore 120 hp six-cylinder water-cooled inline engines, 120 hp (89 kW) each

Armament

- Guns: 5× .303 inch (7.7 mm) Lewis guns
- Bombs: Unspecified bombload

== See also ==
Related lists

- List of aircraft of the Royal Naval Air Service
