= Charles Gordon Bell =

British pilot (1889–1918)

- Born: 31 May 1889
- Died: 29 July 1918 (aged 29); Villacoubley
- Military career
- Allegiance: United Kingdom
- Rank: Major (temporary)
- Other work: flying instructor, test pilot

Charles Gordon Bell (31 May 1889 – 29 July 1918) was an early British pilot. He was one of the first hundred licensed pilots in the United Kingdom, and in a short career became known as one of the most skilled and experienced pilots in the country. During the First World War he became an ace, shooting down five German aircraft, before returning to England to work as a flying instructor and test pilot. He was killed in July 1918, when an experimental aircraft he was flying crashed in France.

== Early career ==
Gordon Bell was awarded Aviator's Certificate #100 by the Royal Aero Club in 1911, making him one of the earliest qualified pilots in the country. As with many early aviators, he had learned at the Brooklands flying school. He then moved to France, where he worked for Robert Esnault-Pelterie's aircraft firm R.E.P.; while demonstrating one of their aircraft to potential buyers in Turkey, he became the first person to fly across the Sea of Marmara.

Over the following years, he became famous in flying circles, and was considered one of the most skilled pilots in the country. By 1914, he had flown over sixty different models of aircraft. However, his reputation had been damaged by a fatal accident at Brooklands in 1913, where Gordon Bell's aircraft crashed whilst flying low over the airfield. The accident was ruled entirely due to pilot error, and he was formally cautioned by the Royal Aero Club. The passenger, a naval lieutenant, was killed, and Gordon Bell was badly injured.

== Military service ==
At the time of the outbreak of the First World War, he was called up as a Special Reserve officer by the Royal Flying Corps, and flew on active service over the Western Front. He became an "ace", credited with shooting down five enemy aircraft. He served with No. 10 Squadron RFC, flying Bristol Scouts.

Ill-health caused Gordon Bell to be invalided back to England at the end of 1915, where he was appointed to command a squadron at the Central Flying School, Upavon, rising to the temporary rank of Major. In late 1917 he was invalided out of the Army, and joined Vickers as a test pilot. He was killed on 29 July 1918 while flying an experimental Vickers F.B.16E at Villacoublay Airfield, and buried at Cimetière des Gonards in Versailles.

He was the most successful pilot flying the Bristol Scout, having downed all of his 5 victories in the type.
