= Spencer-Stirling biplane =

General information
- Type: Pusher Biplane
- National origin: United Kingdom
- Designer: Herbert Spencer
- Primary user: Royal Naval Air Service
- Number built: 1

History
- First flight: 9 November 1910

The Spencer-Stirling biplane was a 1910s British pusher configuration biplane designed and built by Herbert Spencer. It was sometimes referred to as a Spencer-Farman in reference to the design similarity to Henry Farman's designs. (Note: Farman wrote a letter in Flight on 28 October 1911 disclaiming this and other aircraft as products of the Farman company)

Mainly based at Brooklands Aerodrome it was also flown around the country by Spencer on demonstration and training flights.

Initially powered by an RH 4-cylinder in-line engine rated at 40–70 hp (30–52 kW), the Spencer-Stirling biplane was re-engined in July 1911 with a 50 hp (37 kW) Gnome Gamma rotary engine. On 29 August 1911 Spencer obtained his Aviator's Certificate at Brooklands flying the biplane he built.

== Operational history ==
After initial straight hops, the Spencer-Stirling was successfully tested by Henri Pecquet in June 1911 shortly before the Gnome engine was fitted. After passing his aviators certificate, Spencer used the Spencer-Stirling for competition and demonstration flights until the aircraft crashed on 25 February 1912.
