= Dyott monoplane =

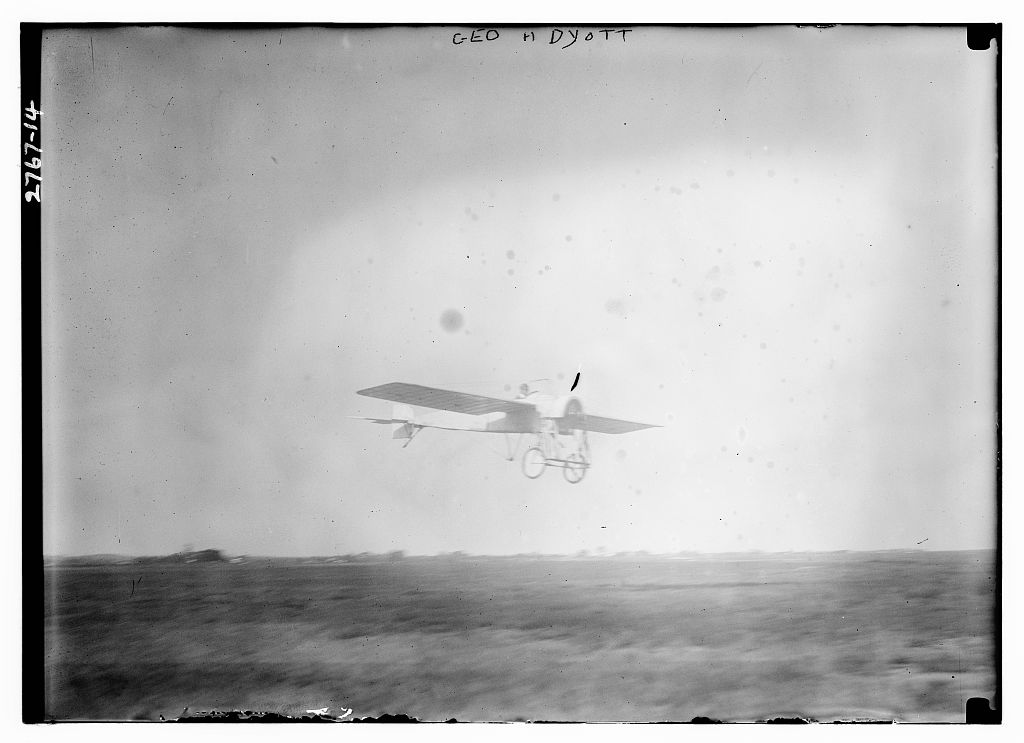

General information
- Type: Sport and touring monoplane
- National origin: United Kingdom
- Manufacturer: Hewlett & Blondeau Co. Ltd, London
- Designer: George Miller Dyott
- Primary user: G.M Dyott
- Number built: 1

History
- First flight: early 1913

The Dyott monoplane was a single-engined, single-seat mid-wing monoplane designed by George Miller Dyott for his own use as a sports and touring aircraft. It proved successful, making a six-month tour of the United States soon after its first flight in 1913.

== Design ==
The Dyott monoplane was named after its designer and owner, George Dyott. He had earned Royal Aero Club Aviators' Certificate (no. 114) in 1911 and designed his cross country machine the following year. One strength of the design was the simplicity of rigging and assembly, making it easy to transport by land or sea where necessary. The machine was built by Hewlett & Blondeau of Clapham, London.

The Dyott was a single-seat, mid-wing monoplane of clean appearance for its day. The fuselage was built up around four longerons. These were of ash in the stressed region from wing spars to engine, spruce at the rear and internally wire braced. Stringers behind the cockpit formed a smooth rounded decking under the overall fabric covering. The forward fuselage, including the cockpit was aluminium clad, with a neat nose piece over the 7-cylinder, 50 hp (37 kW) Gnome rotary engine, more to protect the pilot from oil than for streamlining. Steel tubing was used in several places: the empennage was steel framed, as was the pilot's seat, and steel tubes formed the vertical undercarriage members. There were four of the latter, each pair mounting a short wooden skid with steel cross bracing and a single axle on shock absorbers carrying a pair of wheels. The undercarriage was initially completed with a long sprung tail skid, later replaced by a shorter cane skid mounted further aft. At the same time, Dyott made some changes to the transverse bracing of the main undercarriage.

The low aspect ratio wings were parallel edged and almost square tipped, with the thin airfoil section typical of the time. They were built around two spars, each a spruce-ash-spruce sandwich, and the profile was formed with mixed spruce and ash ribs. Both spars fitted into sockets formed by two transverse fuselage struts, but the rear socket was made oversize and the spar attached with a bolt and split pin to allow movement, as the Dyott was laterally controlled by wing warping. The main in-flight aerodynamic forces on each wing were carried by pairs of cables to the front spar from the forward skid mounting point, an arrangement that caused some concern over the transfer of landing loads to the wing. Each wing was braced from above with four wires, two to each spar, from an inverted V steel pylon just in front of the cockpit. A short vertical steel post below the rear of the cockpit carried pairs of wing warping wires to the rear spar.

The tailplane, attached to the top of the fuselage was triangular, without eternal bracing and carrying elevators with a V-shaped gap to allow rudder movement. The fin was very small and triangular; the rudder hinge ran from fin tip to the bottom of the fuselage. Control wires ran externally from about halfway down the rear fuselage.

The aircraft was completed early in 1913; testing was rapid and satisfactory. It was fitted with the world's first flight data recorder, a device that used pointers to trace records onto a strip of paper running between two rollers.

== Operational history ==
Dyott took the monoplane on a tour of the United States immediately after flight testing was complete. He flew over 2,000 miles (3,200 km) between April and October 1913. The Dyott proved to have good performance ("It goes like a rocket", he wrote) and high reliability, giving demonstration flights across the US from New York to California.

After returning from the US, he entered his monoplane into the London to Brighton handicap, which involved a round trip to Brighton from Hendon Aerodrome, refuelling at Shoreham near Brighton. A strong wind took him off course and required a landing at Beachy Head. This was done successfully, but the wind overturned the aircraft and damaged it, forcing Dyott's retirement.

Dyott planned to take the repaired machine on a tour of India. This did not happen; instead, the monoplane was taken over by the Admiralty in 1914.

The Dyott monoplane appeared in a set of cigarette cards issued by Lambert & Butler in 1915.

== Specifications ==
Data from

General characteristics

- Crew: 1
- Length: 23 ft 0 in (7.01 m)
- Wingspan: 29 ft 0 in (8.84 m)
- Wing area: 148 sq ft (13.7 m^{2})
- Powerplant: 1 × Gnome 7-cylinder rotary, 50 hp (37 kW)

Performance

- Maximum speed: 75 mph (121 km/h, 65 kn)
- Stall speed: 45 mph (72 km/h, 39 kn)
- Endurance: 3 hr
