= Hilda Hewlett =

Aviator and business entrepreneur

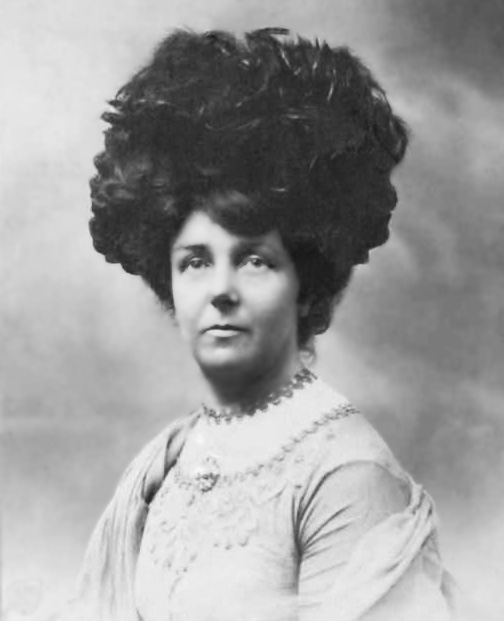
- Photograph taken for her pilot's licence, circa 1911
- Born: 17 February 1864; Vauxhall, London, England
- Died: 21 August 1943 (aged 79); New Zealand
- Occupations: Aviator and business entrepreneur
- Spouse: Maurice Hewlett (1888–1914)
- Children: Pia (Hewlett) Richards, Francis Hewlett
- Parent(s): Louisa Hopgood, George William Herbert

Hilda Beatrice Hewlett (17 February 1864 – 21 August 1943) was an early aviator and aviation entrepreneur. She was the first British woman to earn a pilot's licence. She founded and ran two related businesses: the first flying school in the United Kingdom (with Gustav Blondeau), and a successful aircraft manufacturing business (Hewlett & Blondeau) which produced more than 800 aeroplanes and employed up to 700 people. She later emigrated to New Zealand.

== Early life ==
Hilda Beatrice Hewlett was born in Vauxhall, London on 17 February 1864 to Louisa Herbert née Hopgood and George William Herbert, a Church of England vicar. Hilda was one of nine siblings and was known as "Billy" by the family.

As a young woman she attended the National Art Training School in South Kensington. She specialised in three skills which served her well in her later aviation engineering career: woodwork, metalwork, and needlework. Her art was good enough to be exhibited. When she was 19 she visited Egypt with her parents where ‘I woke up from a narrow, conventional, stultifying childhood and first thought for myself’. At the age of 21 she spent a year training as a nurse at a hospital in Berlin.

She married barrister and writer Maurice Henry Hewlett on 3 January 1888 in St Peter's Church, Vauxhall, where her father was the incumbent. The couple had two children, a daughter, Pia, and a son, Francis, but separated in 1914.

Hilda Hewlett was an early bicycle and motor car enthusiast. The family acquired a car and Hilda learned to drive, and was fined for speeding in May and June 1905 but was considered proficient behind the wheel. She participated in automobile rallies and in 1906 was the passenger/mechanic for Muriel Hind, the only female driver in a motorcar event from Lands End to John O’Groats. Hind was a pioneering motorist, sometimes described as Britain’s first motorcyclist.

== Achievements in aviation ==
Hewlett attended her first aviation meeting at Blackpool in 1909. Later that year, after adopting the pseudonym "Grace Bird", she travelled to the airfield at Mourmelon-le-Grand, France, to study aeronautics. She met aviation engineer Gustav Blondeau and they became business partners. Hewlett returned to England with a Farman III biplane, nicknamed the Blue Bird. In the summer of 1910 she and Blondeau opened the first flying school in the United Kingdom at the Brooklands motor-racing circuit at Weybridge, Surrey. Many people gained their first experience of flying at Hewlett and Blondeau's school, including Thomas Sopwith. Thirteen pupils graduated from the school in the year and a half it operated and, with a remarkable safety record for the time, there were no accidents.

In May 1911 Hilda Hewlett instigated the first pilots’ strike in history. The Brooklands Racing Club announced that the aeroplane pilots would receive 5% of event day takings, to be divided between them. Mrs Hewlett was furious about this, and a letter was drawn up with a demand for 25%. When this was refused she organised a flying strike, pointing out that the flying events drew much larger crowds than the motor racing ever had. Pilots were to fly for only the minimum time to qualify for prizes, and the aeroplanes were locked away to prevent inspection by the public. Soon the management gave way, paying a fairer percentage of takings, and increasing the prize money. The episode attracted great public interest, and turned out to be to everyone’s advantage.

On 29 August 1911, at Brooklands, Hilda Hewlett became the first woman in the UK to earn a pilot's licence when she received certificate No.122 from the Royal Aero Club after completing the test in her biplane. Hewlett also taught her son, Francis, to fly; he earned pilot's certificate no. 156 on 14 November 1911 and went on to have a distinguished military aviation career in both the UK and New Zealand, making him the first military pilot taught to fly by his mother. He earned a Distinguished Service Order in 1915 and rose to the rank of group captain.

Hilda Hewlett participated in airshows and aviation competitions. On 11 September 1911 she flew her Farman biplane in an airshow at Chelson Meadow, Plymouth. In 1912 Hewlett won a quick-start aviation competition.

Hewlett and Blondeau started an aircraft manufacturing business, Hewlett & Blondeau Limited, which was managed by Hewlett. They built Farman, Caudron and Hanriot aircraft under licence. The business began at Brooklands, moved to Battersea, London, and finally settled on a 10-acre (40,000 m^{2}) site at Leagrave, Bedfordshire, in May 1914. By August 1914 the company had produced 10 different types of aircraft.

During the First World War, Hewlett's company manufactured more than 800 military aircraft, a specialised 90 hp (67 kW) engine which the British government considered vital to the war effort, and employed up to 700 people. After the war the business diversified into making farming equipment, but the factory had closed by the end of October 1920. The site remained unsold until 1926. A road in Luton, Hewlett Road, was named after her in recognition of the importance of the company towards the war effort.

== Emigration to New Zealand ==
Hewlett had previously spent nine months touring New Zealand, Rarotonga (Cook Islands), and the United States, but it was not until the factory site was sold that she emigrated to Tauranga, New Zealand, with her daughter Pia Richards and Pia's family. Hilda stated, "The urge to escape from the three Cs, crowds, convention, and civilization, became strong." She enjoyed the outdoor life, especially camping and fishing. Her family gave her the nickname "Old Bird".

In June 1932 Hewlett was present at the inaugural meeting of the Tauranga Aero and Gliding Club. In July she was elected as the club's first president. In January 1939, at the opening of a new aerodrome in Tauranga, Frederick Jones, New Zealand's then Minister of Defence, named a nearby road after Hilda Hewlett and her son Francis, in recognition of their services to aviation.

== Death and legacy ==
Hewlett died on 21 August 1943 in Tauranga, North Island, New Zealand. Following a service on the railway wharf, she was buried at sea.

Her grandson's wife Gail Hewlett has carried out exhaustive research into the lives of both Hilda and Maurice Hewlett and published the results of this work; the book was officially launched on 26 April 2010 at St Peter's Church in Vauxhall London.

A staff photograph and autograph book from the wings section of the Hewlett and Blondeau factory, dated to the First World War, was donated to the Women's Engineering Society's archives in 2022.

In October 2022, Air Chief Marshal Sir Mike Wigstone opened the RAF's Hilda B Hewlett Centre for Innovation, named in her honour. It is part of 71 Inspection & Repair Squadron at RAF Wittering on the border of between Cambridgeshire and Northamptonshire. The facility specialises in 3D printing and scanning equipment, part of the Royal Air Force’s first steps into advanced component manufacturing.

== Works ==
=== Published non-fiction ===
- Our Flying Men, Mrs. Hilda Beatrice Hewlett, pp.40, T.B. Hart: Kettering (1917).

=== Unpublished non-fiction ===
- Hewlett's autobiography was unpublished but the manuscript is in the care of her family and formed the basis for a biography (see above).
