= Gustav Blondeau =

French aviator and businessman

- Born: 8 March 1871; Tergnier, France
- Died: 3 March 1965; Luton, England
- Occupation(s): Aviator and business entrepreneur

Gustav Jules Eugene Blondeau (1871-1965) was an early pilot and went on to form Hewlett & Blondeau Limited, an aircraft manufacturer in the United Kingdom. He was born on 8 March 1871 in Tergnier, France, (a small town to the North East of Paris) and graduated from Farman Aircraft at Mourmelon in France on 10 July 1910, then joining the Gnome engine works. He later opened his own flying school at Brooklands, Surrey, (the famous motor racing circuit) where he met Hilda Hewlett.

Together they formed Hewlett & Blondeau and built Farman, Caudron, Avro and Hanriot aircraft under licence, they were the first UK producers of Caudron aircraft. Blondeau died on 3 March 1965 at 176 Old Bedford Road Luton.
