= Hewlett & Blondeau =

English aeroplane manufacturer

Hewlett & Blondeau Limited
- Industry: Aerospace, Engineering
- Founded: circa 1910
- Defunct: 1920
- Fate: bankrupt
- Headquarters: Luton, England, UK
- Key people: Hilda Hewlett, Gustav Blondeau
- Products: Aircraft
- Number of employees: 700

Hewlett & Blondeau was a manufacturer of aeroplanes and other equipment based in Leagrave, Luton, England which produced more than 800 aeroplanes and employed up to 700 people.

== History ==
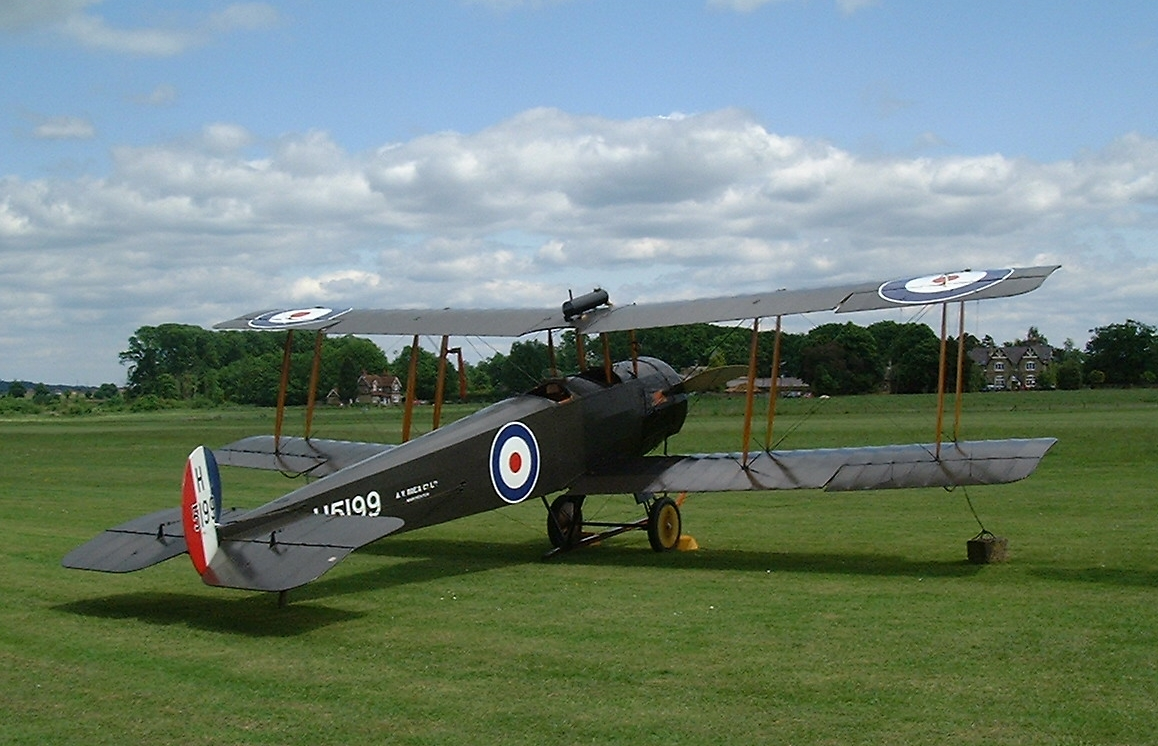
An Avro 504 near Cambridge.Avro 504 of the type produced by Hewlett & Blondeau

The company was formed by Hilda Hewlett and Gustav Blondeau. The two met at Brooklands, Surrey where Blondeau had opened his own flying school. Hewlett was the first British woman to earn a pilot's licence. Together they formed "Hewlett and Blondeau" and built Farman, Avro, Caudron and Hanriot aircraft under licence. They were the first company to build Caudron aircraft in Britain. The first factory was a disused ice-skating rink called The Omnia Battersea, London, where eventually they produced ten different types of aircraft.

In May 1914, Hewlett & Blondeau purchased a field in Leagrave, Bedfordshire, specifically to build Farman aircraft. In order to retain links with its former base in Clapham, the firm kept the old telegraphic address 'Aeromnia', and named the factory The Omnia Works. When the First World War started in August 1914, the factory was able to meet government orders for aircraft for the wartime expansion of the Royal Flying Corps.

The factory employed around 700 people at its peak, but by 1919, despite a full order book, the firm encountered difficulties. The Air Ministry appointed Ashley Pope to oversee the factory because one of the aircraft in production at the time had a large 90 hp (67 kW) engine which was vital to the war effort. Pope noted that Hewlett worked tirelessly nearly 24 hours per day, barely stopping for breaks or meals.

A reporter from Implement and Machinery Review was invited to look around the site in September 1919. He reported the following

"Having made a notable contribution to the war efforts of the nation by manufacturing large numbers of aeroplanes, Messrs. Hewlett & Blondeau Ltd., of The Omnia Works, Leagrave, Beds. have, for some time now, directed their attention to agricultural engineering. There are adequate reasons why their venture should be highly successful. In the first place, on the ten acres of freehold land which form the works site has been built a series of up-to-date substantial shops, fitted with the latest type of machinery and replete in every way with labour saving devices. The whole of the 120,000 sq ft (11,000 m^{2}) of buildings is commodious, airy and thoroughly modern, for the works were of 'mushroom growth' so common during the war, albeit it cannot be too strongly emphasised that they are solidly and well constructed. "In addition to the usual offices, stores, etc., the works comprise machine, fitting, inspection, woodworking, erecting and smithing shops, a sheetmetal works, hardening & annealing rooms, an iron foundry and an acetylene welding department. Over three hundred 'hands' are today employed and the promising outlook makes the prospect of an increase in this number very probable."

=== Post WWI ===
Adverts for Hewlett and Blondeau engines and sawbenches appeared in the Luton News during late 1919 with the last advertisement being on 12 February 1920. A decision was made to close the works and Fuller, Horley and Son & Cassell of London arranged a six-day sale of the site and contents of the factory starting on Tuesday 19 October 1920. The 8-acre (32,000 m^{2}) site with 110,000-square-foot (10,000 m^{2}) of buildings failed to reach the second asking bid of £50,000 and went for private treaty, eventually being sold to Electrolux and forming part of the then new Electrolux factory where some of the original buildings remain to this day. Much of the site was redeveloped in the 1990s and early 2000s into residential housing.

The plant, machinery, stock and effects sold well to a large number of businesses including Vauxhall Motors and Hayward Tyler, the latter still having a factory in Luton. Mrs Hewlett, having separated from her husband in 1914, eventually emigrated with her family to New Zealand where she died in 1943. She is commemorated by a street name, Hewlett Road, in Leagrave. Gustav Blondeau died on 3 March 1965 at 176 Old Bedford Road Luton.

== Aircraft ==
Aircraft built by Hewlett & Blondeau include:

- AD Scout
- Armstrong Whitworth F.K.3, 350 were built by Hewlett & Blondeau.
- Avro 504
- Dyott monoplane
- Dyott Bomber, 2 built in 1916.

=== French aircraft built by Hewlett & Blondeau ===
- Farman
- Caudron
- Hanriot
