= Macfie monoplane =

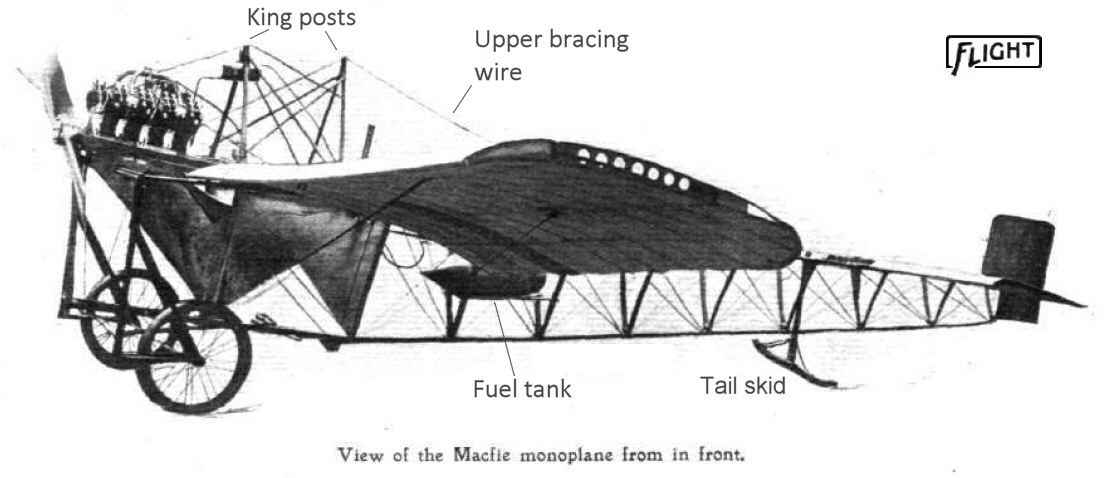
- Side view showing the general layout of the Macfie Monoplane. Note the king-posts and bracing wires for wing-warping and the fuel tank. Image from Flightglobal (see Bibliography below)

General information
- Type: Experimental aircraft
- National origin: British
- Designer: Robert Macfie
- Number built: 1

History
- First flight: 1909

The Macfie monoplane was a British shoulder wing, tractor monoplane. The aircraft was powered by a 35 hp (26 kW) J.A.P. V8 engine fixed at the front of an open-frame 'fuselage', at the rear end of which a tailplane and vertical rudder were mounted.

It was designed, built, and flown by Robert Francis Macfie, an American-born engineer and early aviator who in 1909 moved to England to study engineering. Construction of the monoplane commenced on 2 August 1909, and was completed on 16 September. The first flights took place at Fambridge, sometime during the following five weeks.

The aircraft superficially resembled the Blériot XI in terms of overall configuration but was in almost every design detail different from this aircraft. Like the Blériot, control was effected using wing-warping via wires attached to king posts. However the Macfie monoplane incorporated many innovative features and in particular was designed for ease of construction, maintenance and repair.

Later, during the First World War, Macfie persuaded the Landships Committee to consider the use of caterpillar tracks in designing an armoured fighting vehicle, which led to the first British tanks. He produced a number of designs of his own, but his attempts to have the ideas officially adopted were unsuccessful.

== Design and development ==
=== Fuselage ===
The body of the Macfie monoplane comprised an uncovered V-section framework made of ash wood, in which three longitudinal members were braced together at intervals of approximately 2 ft. (0.61 m) by wooden struts. The framework was approximately 3 ft. (0.91 m) in height at the forward end, tapering to 1 ft. (0.30 m) at the tail; likewise the width of the frame tapered from approx. 2 ft. 6 in. (0.76 m) at the front to 1 ft at the tail. The lowest longitudinal member, at the point of the V-section, was approximately parallel to the ground when at rest, so that the two upper members sloped gradually from front to rear.

To avoid weakening the frame by mortise and tenon joints between the longitudinal members and the struts, the latter abutted against the former and were held in place by right-angled steel brackets, which were bound to the wooden members by strips of Irish linen tape soaked in glue, the glue still being wet when the tape was bound, setting in situ. The corners of the angle brackets were indented at the apex to provide room for a steel pin and also provided with a horizontal slot across the corner, so that a bracing wire could pass through the slot and around the pin, enabling a simple, secure and easily replaceable mounting for the bracing wires which kept the frame in shape. Each of the corners of each triangular set of struts was braced to the diagonally opposite corner of the adjacent set. This method of construction avoided the use of wood-screws, which could eventually become difficult to fix and were often found in other aircraft to damage the members they were intended to strengthen.

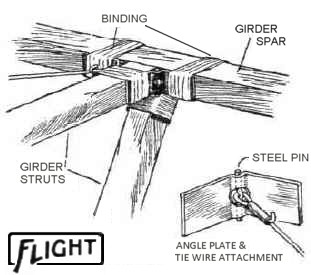
Diagram showing the joints between the fuselage spars and struts, and the angle brackets which provided anchor points for the bracing tie-wires (from Flightglobal (see Bibliography below))

=== Wings and control surfaces ===
The main-planes consisted of a wooden frame covered both top and bottom with Continental fabric (No. 100 B). The structure consisted of two main spars and a set of shaped ribs spaced about 12 ins (0,30 m) apart, which provided an aerofoil camber. Each rib projected forwards of the front spar and was fitted into the U-section of a rigid leading edge member. The trailing edge was formed without a rigid member. The wings were set at a dihedral angle, each main spar being rigidly fixed to the main frame at the required angle. The rear spar was attached to the frame by means of a single horizontal bolt fixed parallel to the longitudinal axis of the fuselage, which allowed the wings a degree of freedom to flex vertically when wing-warping was applied.

The tailplane was of similar construction, but the forward spar was more sturdy, because the whole tailplane was pivoted about this spar, enabling it to act as an elevator.

The balanced rudder was made of 'Venesta' plywood. Macfie employed a sandwich construction, with a light framework glued between two 3-ply Venesta layers, thus combining lightness with strength.

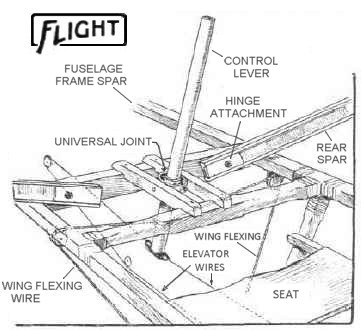
Diagram showing the pilot's seat, control lever ("Joystick") and wire linkages to elevator and wings (from Flightglobal (see Bibliography below))

=== Undercarriage ===
The Macfie Monoplane's undercarriage consisted of two main wheels (diameter approx. 26 in. (0.66m)) mounted below the engine, and a rear skid mounted on the sixth triangular brace from the front of the main body frame, i.e. about two-thirds of the distance back from front to tail. The two main wheels were attached, by two forked brackets, to the vertical members of a transverse rectangular chassis made of steel tubing, which transferred the weight of the engine at rest through the wheels to the ground. Each wheel was mounted behind its respective vertical member via two swivelling forked brackets, one horizontal and one sloping upwards at approximately 30 degrees, so that the two brackets and the vertical frame member formed a right-angled triangle. A helical compression spring on the vertical tube above the diagonal bracket provided a degree of sprung suspension while allowing the wheels, which were not steerable, to swivel independently.

The tail-skid was designed for use on sand; it consisted of a lower horizontal 'shoe' which was fitted to a vertical wooden support by a single pivoted axle, the whole assembly being free to swivel about its vertical axis. The horizontal 'shoe' was rounded upwards at front and rear to allow it to ride over small undulations in the landing strip, its rotation about its axle being dampened at the rear by a length of steel spring and in front by elastic strip.

=== Engine ===
The engine, an air-cooled J.A.P. V8 providing 35 hp (26 kW), was mounted at the front on two timber extensions to the body frame, which were supported, when at rest, by the upper transverse member of the rectangular chassis to which the main wheels were attached (see above). The two-bladed solid teak propeller, also made by Macfie, had a diameter of 6 ft 6 in. (1.98 m) and was mounted directly onto the crankshaft. During development it was found that removing part of the trailing edge of the blades "resulted in a considerable improvement in tractive effort".

=== Control ===
The pilot controlled the aircraft by means of a universally pivoted lever (later to be known as a joystick) to induce roll and/or pitch, and a pivoted footrest which operated the rudder (for yaw). The control lever, when moved forwards or backwards, operated the wires (via vertical cross-members attached to the tailplane spar) to rotate the whole tailplane; when the lever was moved to the left or right, the attached wires warped the wings to induce roll.

== Specifications ==
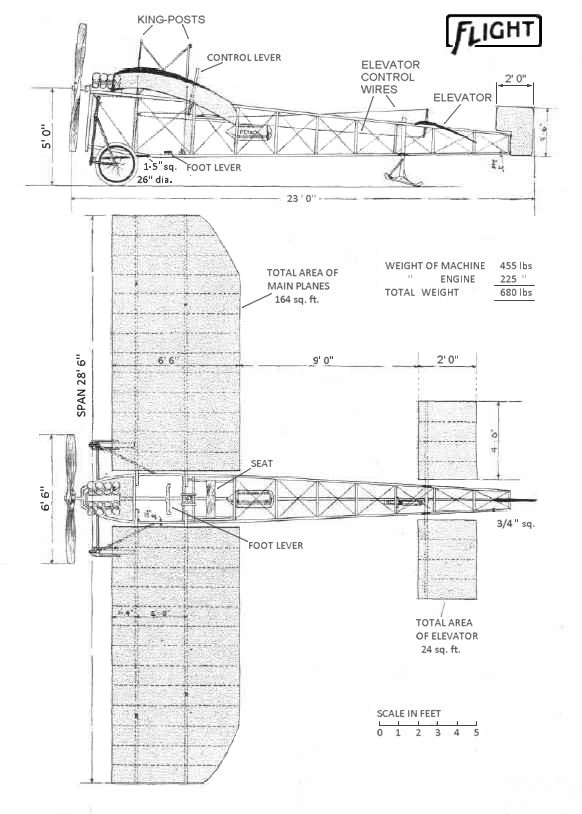
Side and plan elevations of the Macfie Monoplane (from Flightglobal (see Bibliography))

Data from Flight 5 March 1910 and Flight 12 March 1910

General characteristics

- Crew: 1
- Length: 23 ft 6 in (7.16 m)
- Wingspan: 28 ft 6 in (8.69 m)
- Height: 5 ft 0 in (1.52 m) height of propeller axis
- Wing area: 193 sq ft (17.9 m^{2}) includes 24 sq.ft. (2.23 m^{2}) for tailplane
- Empty weight: 680 lb (308 kg)
- Powerplant: 1 × J.A.P. V8 air-cooled, 35 hp (26 kW) 225 lb (102 kg)
- Propellers: 2-bladed Macfie, 6 ft 6 in (1.98 m) diameter

Performance

- Wing loading: 3.52 lb/sq ft (17.2 kg/m^{2})

== See also ==
Aircraft of comparable role, configuration, and era

- Blackburn First Monoplane
- Blériot XI
- Ferguson monoplane
