= George Bayard Hynes =

RFC & RAF officer (1887-1938)

- Born: 12 April 1887; Malta
- Died: 30 May 1938 (aged 51)
- Military career
- Allegiance: United Kingdom
- Branch: Royal Artillery; Royal Flying Corps; Royal Air Force
- Rank: Group Captain
- Conflicts: World War I
- Awards: Distinguished Service Order
- Other work: Air Ministry Deputy Director of Aeronautical Inspection

Group Captain George Bayard Hynes DSO (12 April 1887 – 30 May 1938) was an early pioneer English aviator, one of the first Army pilots. He was awarded the DSO during service with the Royal Flying Corps during the first world war, retired as a Royal Air Force Group Captain in 1931 and became the deputy director of aeronautical inspection in the Air Ministry.

Hynes was born on 12 April 1887, in Malta the son of William and Mary Hynes. His father was described in 1891 as a Naval Storekeeper. He was educated at Portsmouth Grammar School.

Hynes gained a commission in the Royal Artillery in 1905. On 7 January 1911, he was awarded the 77th Aviators Certificate from the Royal Aero Club and was then seconded to the Air Battalion of the Royal Engineers and later in 1912 to the Royal Flying Corps. Hynes served in France where he was awarded the DSO and mentioned in dispatches five times.

In 1918 he transferred to the new Royal Air Force with a permanent commission as a Wing Commander. He retired in 1931 and went on to become the Deputy Director of Aeronautical Inspection at the Air Ministry. Hynes died in London on 30 May 1938.

== Honours and awards ==
- 1 January 1917 – Capt. (temp. Maj.) George Bayard Hynes, RA. & RFC is awarded the Distinguished Service Order for distinguished service in the field.
