= George Miller Dyott =

British explorer (1883–1972)

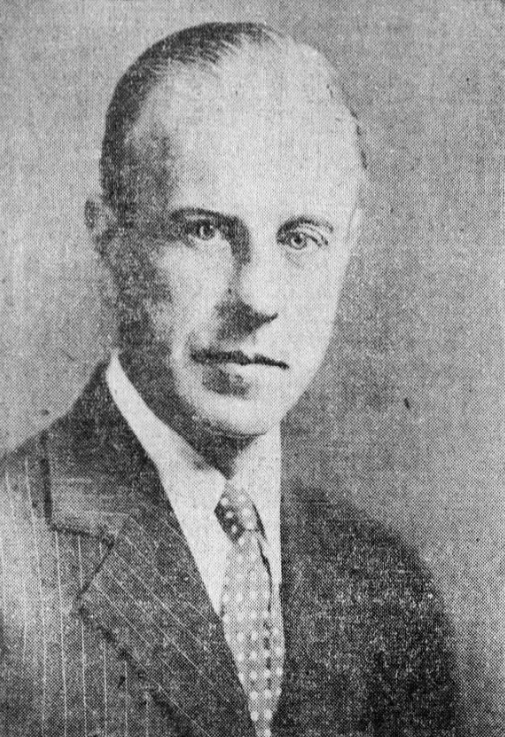
- Dyott (c. 1927)
- Born: 6 February 1883; New York City, U.S.
- Died: 2 August 1972 (aged 89); New York City, U.S.
- Occupations: Aviator; cinematographer; explorer
- Spouse: Persis Wright (m. 1928)

George Miller Dyott (6 February 1883 – 2 August 1972) was an English pioneer aviator, cinematographer, and explorer of the Amazon. Dyott accompanied Arthur S. Vernay to India and helped produce a documentary on tiger hunting.

== Biography ==
Dyott was born in New York City to a British father and American mother. Dyott was raised at his father's English home Freeford Hall in Staffordshire and educated at Bedford Grammar School. He went on to train as an electrical engineer at Faraday House in London. He testflew planes not long after the Wright brothers, and was the first pilot to fly at the Nassau Aerodrome (Mitchell Field) on Long Island at night, in October 1911. He was awarded his Royal Aero Club pilot's Certificate (Number 114) on 17 August 1911.

Though less well known now, Dyott gained his licence soon after many of the most famous names of early aviation. Moore-Brabazon was the first to gain the newly devised certificate, on 8 March 1910 and Rolls, Grahame-White, Cody, Roe, Sopwith followed in that year, but de Havilland and Blackburn won theirs in 1911, only a few months before Dyott.

In the autumn of 1911 Dyott and Capt. Patrick Hamilton travelled to New York with two Deperdussin monoplanes, a two-seater and a single seater. They made an exhibition tour, stopping for a while at the Nassau Aerodrome and in Mexico City. A highlight, literally, of the Nassau exhibition was a night flight in the two seater, with Hamilton as passenger, carrying a searchlight powered by the plane's motor. In Mexico the two seater carried many passengers, including the Mexican Republic's President Madero. He later reported on the different flying conditions in hot climates, particularly the effects of thermals, rotating winds and the excitement of flying over forest fires.

After returning to the UK, he decided to design his own aircraft. This was known as the Dyott monoplane; after receiving and testing it, Dyott took it to the US in April 1913. He made a sixth month demonstration tour, flying for more than 2,000 miles at venues between New York and California. When he returned to the UK he flew it in the London-Brighton handicap of November 1913, but had to make an unscheduled landing.

After serving as a Royal Naval Air Service squadron commander during the First World War, he became an explorer and joined the Royal Geographical Society. In 1927, he was the second person to transverse the Amazonian "River of Doubt", in the footsteps of the 1913–14 Roosevelt-Rondon Scientific Expedition. Dyott wanted to verify Roosevelt's claim of discovering the river, for which there had been some doubt. The day after his marriage to Persis Wright in 1928, he mounted an expedition to search for the missing British explorer Percy Fawcett in the Amazon. Dyott found evidence he believed confirmed Fawcett had been killed by the Aloique Indians, but the strength of his evidence soon collapsed on closer scrutiny and the mystery of Fawcett's disappearance remained unresolved.

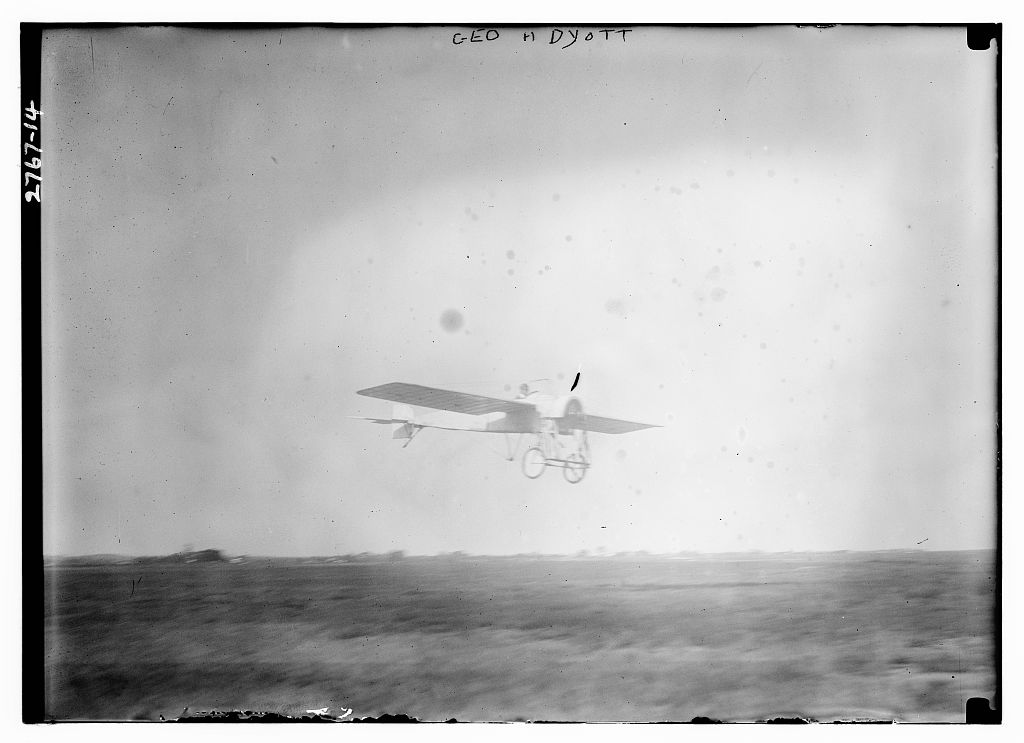
Dyott monoplane being flown by Dyott circa 1913. The aircraft, a Morane-Saulnier, is here fitted with Bleriot landing gear.

Related to the Fawcett expedition, during which Dyott was held captive by Indians and barely escaped with his life, Dyott published a book about his adventures called Manhunting in the Jungle (1930), and also co-wrote and starred in a 1933 Hollywood action film called Savage Gold. The book was later adapted to film as Manhunt in the Jungle (1958). In 1929 Dyott played himself in a documentary called Hunting Tigers in India, filmed in India on the A. S. Vernay expedition under the auspices of the American Museum of Natural History. It was billed as "the first all-talking nature picture" and was supposedly shown to First Lady Mrs. Hoover in the White House theatre.

Dyott was active in the early years of aviation in South America too. He established a company, Dyott & Company Ltd. of Lima, taking aerial photographs, scenic vistas and native scenes, which were sold as post-cards. Dyott retired to Santo Domingo de los Colorados, Ecuador, sometime in the mid-1930s. During World War II, Dyott returned to England in service of his country and a few years after the war's end retired once again to Ecuador. Dyott came out of retirement in 1947 and conducted his two final expeditions, which departed from Pillaro, Ecuador, venturing into the Llanganati Mountains in search of lost Inca Treasure.

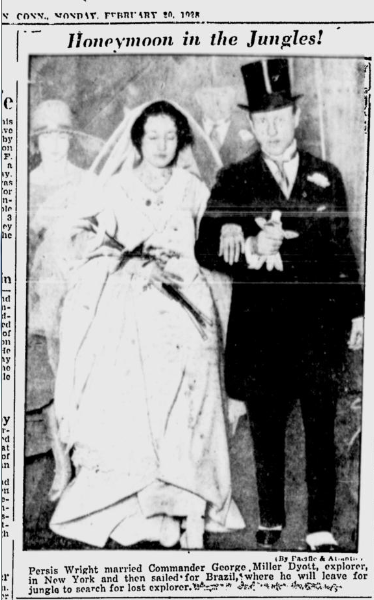
"Honeymoon in the Jungle" newspaper clipping

Dyott spent most of his life in South America but died in the city of his birth, New York City, in 1972.

== Works ==
Books

- Possibilities of Aerial Transport in Peru (1919)
- Silent Highways of the Jungle: Being the Adventures of an Explorer in the Andes and Reaches of the Upper Amazon (1922)
- On the Trail of the Unknown. In the wilds of Ecuador and the Amazon. With plates and a map (1926)
- The Volcanoes of Ecuador, Guideposts in Crossing South America (1929)
- Manhunting in the Jungle, The search for Colonel Fawcett (1930)
- Nip and Tuck: A true story of two little bears (1935)

Film

- Hunting Tigers in India (1929; as himself, documentary)
- Savage Gold (1933; co-wrote story, and plays himself)
- Manhunt in the Jungle (1958; screenplay based on his book Manhunting in the Jungle)
