= Brooklands =

Defunct motorsport venue in England

- Brooklands circuit layout
- Location: Surrey, England, UK
- Coordinates: 51°20′56″N 0°28′21″W
- Capacity: 287,000
- Broke ground: October 1906; 120 years ago
- Opened: 17 June 1907; 119 years ago
- Closed: August 1939; 87 years ago
- Major events: British Grand Prix (1926–1927)

Outer Circuit (1907–1939)
- Surface: Concrete
- Length: 4.453 km (2.767 mi)
- Turns: 3
- Banking: 30°

Grand Prix Circuit (1926–1939)
- Length: 4.210 km (2.616 mi)
- Turns: 3

Mountain Circuit (1930–1935)
- Length: 1.880 km (1.168 mi)
- Turns: 3

International Trophy Circuit (1937–1939)
- Length: 5.422 km (3.369 mi)
- Turns: 8

Campbell Circuit (1937–1939)
- Length: 3.648 km (2.267 mi)
- Turns: 8

Brooklands was a 2.767-mile (4.453 km) motor racing circuit and aerodrome built near Weybridge in Surrey, England, United Kingdom. It opened in 1907 and was the world's first purpose-built 'banked' motor racing circuit (Note: Several venues hosted auto races prior to the opening of Brooklands, but all were originally built for purposes other than motorsport. The Milwaukee Mile (1903), Fairgrounds Speedway in Nashville (1904), and Aspendale Racecourse near Melbourne (1906) were all originally built as horse racing tracks. Prior to the opening of Brooklands, Crystal Palace, London built a cycle track which was also used for motorcycle racing.) as well as one of Britain's first airfields, which also became Britain's largest aircraft manufacturing centre by 1918, producing military aircraft such as the Wellington and civil airliners like the Viscount and VC10.

The circuit hosted its last race in August 1939 and today part of it forms the Brooklands Museum, a major aviation and motoring museum, as well as a venue for vintage car, motorcycle and other transport-related events.

== History ==
=== Beginnings ===
The Brooklands motor circuit was the brainchild of Hugh Fortescue Locke King, and was the first purpose-built banked motor race circuit in the world. Following the Motor Car Act 1903, Britain was subject to a blanket 20 mph (32 km/h) speed limit on public roads: at a time when nearly 50% of the world's new cars were produced in France, there was concern that Britain's infant auto-industry would be hampered by the inability to undertake sustained high-speed testing. King commissioned Colonel Capel Lofft Holden of the Royal Artillery to design the projected circuit and work began in 1906.

Requirements of speed and spectator visibility led to the Brooklands track being built as a 100 ft (30 m) wide, 2.767 mi (4.453 km) long, banked oval. The banking was nearly 30 feet (9.1 m) high in places. In addition to the oval, a bisecting "Finishing Straight" was built, increasing the track length to 3.369 mi (5.422 km), of which 1.250 mi (2.012 km) was banked. It could host up to 287,000 spectators in its heyday.

Owing to the complications of laying tarmacadam on banking, and the expense of laying asphalt, the track was built in uncoated concrete. This led in later years to a somewhat bumpy ride, as the surface suffered differential settlement over time.

Along the centre of the track ran a dotted black line, known as the Fifty Foot Line. By driving over the line, a driver could theoretically take the banked corners without having to use the steering wheel.

The track was opened on 17 June 1907 with a luncheon attended by most of Britain's motor manufacturers. At the conclusion of the luncheon, Mr Locke King (on whose estate the track was built) named Lord Montagu of Beaulieu, Messrs. Hugh Owen, Julian Walter Orde (secretary of the Automobile Club of Great Britain and Ireland) and Colonel Holden as being the main people that enabled the track to be built. This was followed by an informal inauguration of the track by a procession of 43 cars, one driven by Charles Rolls. The first competitive event was held on 28–29 June, with three cars competing to break the world record for distance covered in 24 hours, and the first race meeting was held on 6 July, attracting over 10,000 spectators.

Apparently drawing inspiration from the development at Brooklands, the Indianapolis Motor Speedway was built soon afterwards, and held its inaugural race in August 1909.

=== The Mountain Circuit ===
The Brooklands Mountain Circuit was a small section of the track giving a lap 1.168 mi (1.880 km) long, running from the Fork to the rear of Members' Hill and back. It was created in 1930 using movable barriers.

=== Motoring records ===
==== 24-hour event ====
On 28–29 June 1907, eleven days after the circuit opened, it played host to the world's first 24-hour motor event, with Selwyn Edge leading three specially converted Napier cars around the circuit. A statement of intent had been made in 1906, and Selwyn Edge entered into a physical training program to prepare for the event. His car, "804" was extensively modified, having a special fuel tank, bodywork removed, and a special windscreen. Over 300 red railway lamps were used to light the track during the night. Flares were used to mark the upper boundary of the track. Edge drove his car for the full duration, with the drivers of the other two cars (Henry C. Tryon/A. F. Browning and F. Draper/Frank Newton) taking the more familiar shift approach. During the event Edge covered a distance of 1,581.74 mi (2,545.56 km) at an average speed of 65.91 mph (106.07 km/h), comfortably beating the existing record of 1,096.187 mi (1,764.142 km) set at Indianapolis in 1905.

Women were not allowed to compete for several years. Dorothy Levitt, S. F. Edge's leading driver, was refused entry despite having been the 'first English-woman to compete in a motor race' in 1903, and holding the 'Ladies World Land Speed Record'. Edge completed 2,545 km at an average 106.06 km/h, a record which stood for 17 years. The first standard race meeting would be held the next week, on 6 July.

==== One-hour records ====
George E. Stanley broke the one-hour record at Brooklands race track on a Singer motorcycle in 1912, becoming the first ever rider of a 350 cc motorcycle to cover over 60 miles (100 km) in an hour.

The world record for the first person to cover 100 miles in 1 hour was set by Percy E. Lambert at Brooklands, on 15 February 1913 when driving his 4.5 litre sidevalve Talbot. He actually covered 103 miles, 1470 yards (167.1 km) in 60 minutes. A contemporary film of his exploits on that day can be viewed at the Brooklands Museum.

Youngest person to drive a lap at Brooklands

Ivy Cummings is thought to be the youngest person to complete a lap when in 1913, (aged 11/12) she started her father Sydney Cummings' car whilst he was watching aircraft and drove around the course.

==== Distance records ====
In July and August 1929, Violette Cordery and her younger sister Evelyn drove her 4.5 litre four-seater Invicta for 30,000 miles in less than 30,000 minutes (approximately 20 days, 20 hours), averaging 61.57 mph and earning her second Dewar Trophy from the Royal Automobile Club.

=== World War One ===
Brooklands closed to motor racing during World War I, was requisitioned by the War Office and continued its pre-war role as a flying training centre although it was now under military control. Brooklands soon became a major location for the construction, testing and supply of military aeroplanes.

=== Inter-war years ===
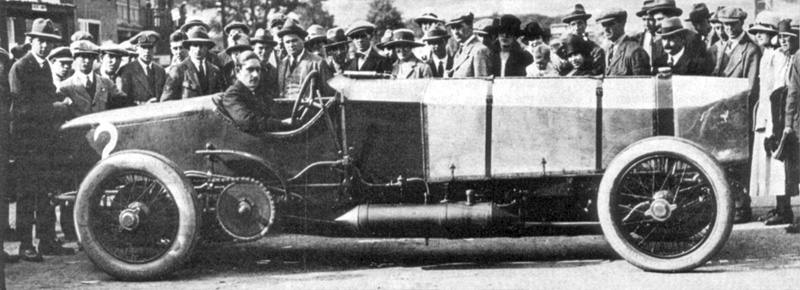
Count Zborowski with Chitty Bang Bang 1 at Brooklands, 1921

Motor racing resumed in 1920 after extensive track repairs and Grand Prix motor racing was established at Brooklands in 1926 by Henry Segrave, after his victories in the 1923 French Grand Prix and the San Sebastián Grand Prix (all won on Sunbeam Racing Cars which in various hands had significant success in Brooklands) the following year raised interest in the sport in Britain. This first British Grand Prix was won by Louis Wagner and Robert Sénéchal, sharing the drive in a Delage 155B. The second British Grand Prix was staged there in 1927 and these two events resulted in improved facilities at Brooklands.

In 1930, the Daily Herald offered a trophy for the fastest driver at an event at Brooklands. The first year, Birkin and Kaye Don competed, the former in a Bentley Blower tourer, the latter in the Sunbeam 'Tigress' 4 litre, Don winning with a speed of 137.58 miles per hour (221.41 km/h). In 1932, Birkin won driving his red "Monoposto" Bentley Blower No.1, clocking 137.96 miles per hour (222.03 km/h). The track record stood for two years, before being beaten by John Cobb driving the 24 litre Napier-Railton, which holds the all-time lap record at 143.44 mph (230.84 km/h).

In 1932, the Junior Car Club organised the British 1000 Miles Race, which was held in two parts on 3 and 4 June. The race was won by Mrs E. Wisdom and Miss Joan Richmond driving a Riley Brooklands 9.

During the late 1930s, Brooklands also hosted massed start cycle racing events organised by the National Cyclists' Union (as the sport's governing body, the NCU banned such events from public roads). In 1939, it was used as a location for the Will Hay film Ask a Policeman. An episode in Johannes V. Jensen's 1936 novel Gudrun takes place at the race track.

Racing stopped upon the outbreak of World War II in 1939. The site was turned over to wartime production of military aircraft. Enemy bombs damaged the track and a new access road to the Hawker factory was cut through from Oyster Lane. Temporary dispersal hangars covered other sections.

== Brooklands Aerodrome ==
=== 1909–1914 ===
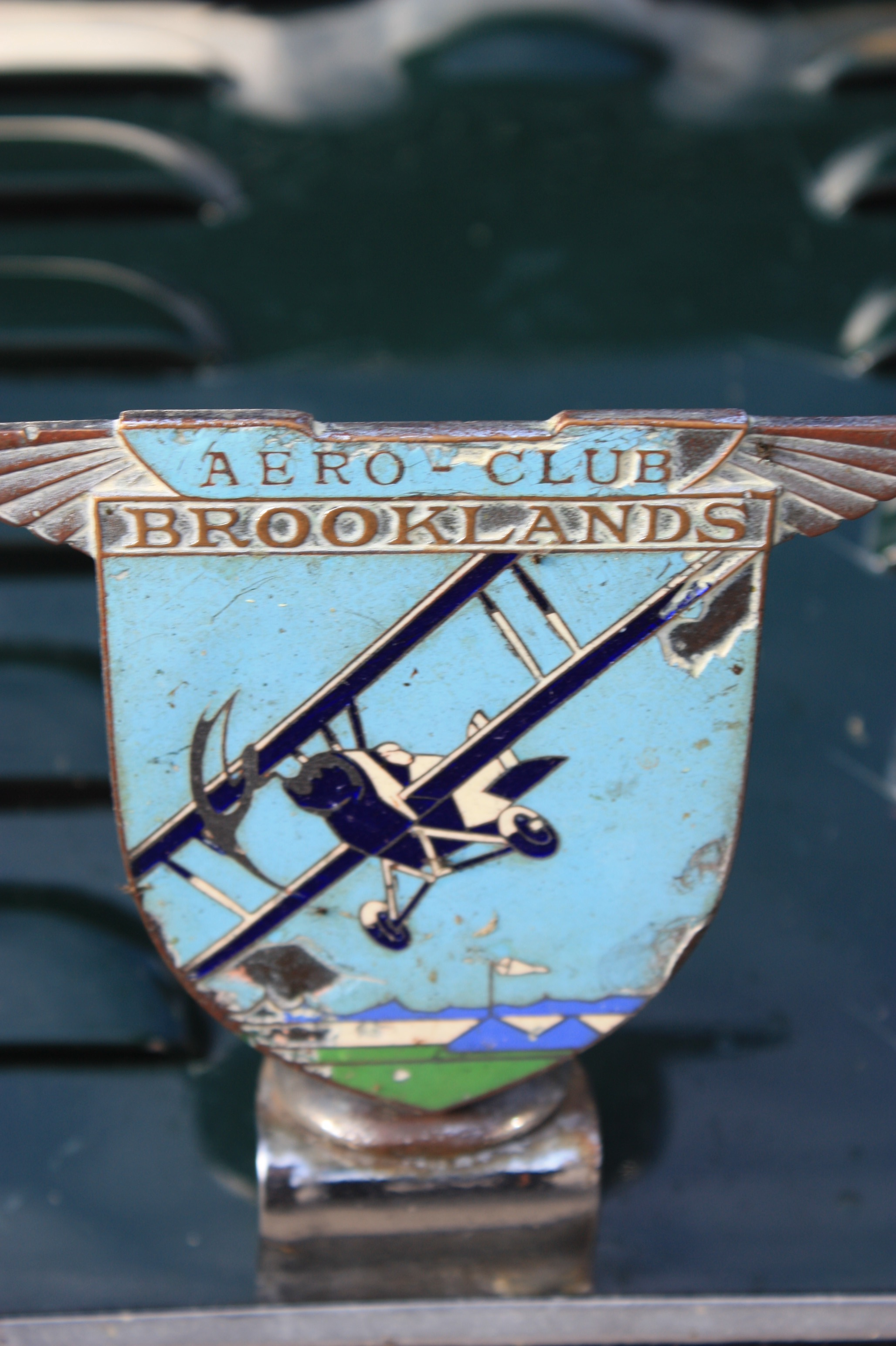
Brooklands Aero-Club car badge

Brooklands was also one of Britain's first airfields. In 1908, Alliott Verdon-Roe was based at Brooklands and carried out the first taxiing and towed flight trials of a British full-size powered aircraft by a British pilot. On Friday, 29 October 1909 the first official powered flight at Brooklands was made by Frenchman Louis Paulhan and his Farman biplane: this special event attracted 20,000 people and was the first public flying display at Brooklands. Operating from specially prepared land inside the Race Track and given his own aeroplane shed, Paulhan made a series of flights on the following days, flying to a height of some 720 ft (220 m) on the Saturday and setting a new British endurance record of 2 hr 49 min 20 s on the Monday.

During 1910, Brooklands rapidly became a major centre of flying in Britain and that summer, Hilda Hewlett and Gustave Blondeau opened Britain's first flying school at Brooklands. Hewlett and Blondeau also started their aircraft manufacturing company, Hewlett & Blondeau Limited there before moving to larger premises in Clapham in London. Later in 1910 the Bristol Aeroplane Company also established a flying school, its first instructor and test pilot was Archie Low; Roe also started a flying school there. Vickers opened a flying school on 20 January 1912, and among its first instructors was R. Harold Barnwell; 77 pupils including Hugh Dowding were taught to fly until the school closed in August 1914.

In February 1912, Thomas Sopwith opened his flying school and in June, with several others, he set up the Sopwith Aviation Company there, although their manufacturing premises were at Kingston upon Thames. Other aviation pioneers came to Brooklands before World War One including Prince Serge de Bolotoff who tried to build a large tandem triplane in a shed there in 1913. Blériot, Martinsyde and Vickers also later produced military aeroplanes at Brooklands which became Britain's largest aircraft manufacturing centre by 1918. Many flying schools operated here before 1914 and the aerodrome became a major flying training centre between the wars.

=== World War I ===
During World War I Brooklands closed to motor racing and was requisitioned by the War Office. Vickers Aviation Ltd set up a factory in 1915, and Brooklands soon became a major centre for the construction, testing and supply of military aeroplanes. Civilian flying schools closed down or were merged into one Military Training School and flying training continued until at least the end of 1915. Several Royal Flying Corps squadrons including numbers 1, 8, 9 and 10 (plus No. 2 and 23 Reserve Squadrons) were formed (or reformed) and based briefly at Brooklands during the war years. Continuing significant pioneering air-ground wireless trials pioneered by a Marconi team at Brooklands from 1912, the aerodrome also housed various RFC units testing and training with airborne wireless communications equipment and the World's first voice to ground wireless message was successfully transmitted over Brooklands in 1915.

Major changes were made to the Flying Village with the construction in late 1917 of three large 'Belfast-truss' General Service Sheds for a new Aircraft Acceptance Park (later No. 10 AAP). This handled the assembly and testing of large numbers of new aeroplanes and finally closed in early 1920.

=== Inter-war years ===
Brooklands Aviation Ltd. was formed in March 1931 - with Percy Bradley, Duncan Davis, Fred Sigrist and Ted Jones as Directors - to operate the aerodrome, and commissioned British airport architect Graham Dawbarn to design the Art Deco Brooklands Aero Clubhouse, which opened in May 1932. The company also operated the resident Brooklands School of Flying which was registered as a limited company in 1931 with Duncan Davis and Ted Jones as Directors, as well as those at Lympne, Shoreham and Sywell Aerodromes in the later 1930s. The original pre-WWI Brooklands Aero Club was re-formed by the BARC in May 1930 with Percy Bradley as Manager and the Brooklands Flying Club was established by Brooklands Aviation in early 1933. Brooklands Aviation won a War Department contract for pilot training for the Royal Air Force. and opened No. 6 Elementary Flying Training School at Sywell on 10 June 1935, training pilots with a fleet of 20 de Havilland Tiger Moths, and in 1937 the RAF Volunteer Reserve School was set up at Sywell with a further 16 training aircraft. During WWII, Brooklands Aviation became a contractor to the Civilian Repair Organisation, repairing various types of damaged aircraft, particularly Vickers Wellingtons. After ending its RAF flying training in 1946, the company diversified and built plywood and GRP cabin cruiser boats designed by Alan Eckford, until 1974.

The first flight of the Hawker Hurricane, later a fighter aircraft in the Battle of Britain, occurred at Brooklands on 6 November 1935.

=== World War II ===
In World War II, the site was again used for military aircraft production, in particular the Vickers Wellington, Vickers Warwick and Hawker Hurricane and was extensively camouflaged. Trees were also planted in some sections of the concrete track to help conceal the Hawker and Vickers aircraft factories there. Despite these efforts, the Vickers factory was successfully bombed by the Luftwaffe and extensively damaged on 4 September 1940 with nearly 90 aircraft workers killed and at least 419 injured. Five unidentified victims were buried in unmarked graves in Burvale Cemetery, Hersham, on 9 September, one of whom was later confirmed to be 36-year-old William E Hunt. On 10 March 2016, thanks to the efforts of local residents, sponsors and supporters, permanent memorials to Mr Hunt and the other four civilians were dedicated by the Reverend Martin Fletcher and Elmbridge Borough Councillor Mary Sheldon. Attendees included relatives of Vickers factory worker Eric S Powell who also died on 4 September 1940 aged 26, and is now believed to be one of the remaining four unidentified casualties buried at Burvale.

The Hawker factory was also bombed and damaged two days later, but with no loss of life or serious disruption to Hurricane production. On 21 September 1940, Lt John MacMillan Stevenson Patton of the Royal Canadian Engineers risked his life when he and five others manhandled an unexploded German bomb away from the Hawker aircraft factory at Brooklands and rolled it into an existing bomb crater where it later exploded harmlessly. His bravery was recognised by the award of the George Cross. The crucial role of Brooklands in the Battle of Britain of 1940 is further explained in displays at Brooklands Museum.

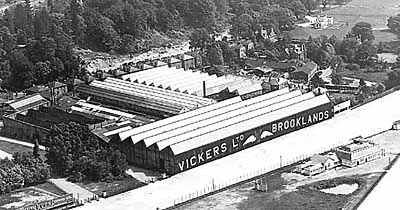
The Vickers factory at Brooklands

After the bombing of Brooklands in September 1940, the Vickers-Armstrongs Design Department (including Rex Pierson, Barnes Wallis and several hundred others) was dispersed to a secret location at the nearby Burhill Golf Course, just east of St George's Hill in Hersham and the Experimental Department led by George Edwards was relocated to temporary premises at Foxwarren in Redhill Road, Cobham. These two facilities played a crucial part in the successful development of the 'Upkeep' mine—better known today as the 'bouncing bomb'—conceived by Barnes Wallis and deployed to devastating effect by the Avro Lancaster raid by No. 617 "Dambuster" Squadron RAF led by Guy Gibson against Germany's Ruhr Valley reservoirs on the night of 16–17 May 1943.

=== Post-1945 ===
After the war, the circuit was in poor condition and was sold to Vickers-Armstrongs in 1946 for continued use as an aircraft factory. New aircraft types, including the Viking, Valetta, Varsity, Viscount, Vanguard, 1-11 and VC10, were subsequently, designed, manufactured and delivered from there. Brooklands Aviation was reactivated in 1947 and on 6 August 1948 it started flying on British European Airways behalf with DH.89 in the South of England and to Channel islands. These operations ceased in 1950 and the company also ceased all typical airline operations in 1954.

In 1951, construction of a new hard runway required a section of the motor circuit's Byfleet Banking to be removed to allow Vickers Valiant V bombers to be flown out to nearby Wisley Airfield, which offered a longer runway and less built-up surroundings than Brooklands. That airfield opened as a flight test centre for Vickers in 1944, and was used until 1972, latterly by BAC.

After considerable expansion, due to increasing commercial success in the 1950s, the Vickers factory achieved its peak size in the early 1960s, in preparation for the VC10 manufacturing programme, and became the headquarters of the new British Aircraft Corporation in 1960. Substantial investment in the site at that time saw many new buildings constructed and existing premises modified. First, in the mid-1950s, came a new assembly hall for the Vickers Viscount, known as 'B.1', presumably because it consisted of a number of repurposed standard wartime B.1-type hangars (together with some T.2 hangars), and was rebuilt as one long double-bay structure parallel to the runway.

By 1962, a large new 60,378-square-foot (5,609 m^{2}) VC10 flight shed hangar was ready to house the prototype VC10 airliner, and a second, even larger, 98,989-square-foot (9,196 m^{2}) flight shed was added alongside by 1964. The latter was probably the largest aircraft hangar in Europe at the time and became known locally as "The Cathedral", while the smaller shed was called "The Abbey". The huge factory at Brooklands went on to design and build the BAC TSR.2, One-Eleven and major assemblies for Concorde.

The cancellation of the V-1000 transport in 1955, the Labour government's cancellation of the TSR-2 in 1965, and the disappointing lack of significant orders for VC10s and Concorde, saw the factory contract in the early 1970s. It became part of the newly formed British Aerospace in 1977, and focused on component manufacture for other aircraft. However, closure was announced on 29 July 1986, finally occurring on Christmas Day 1989. BAE's successor, BAE Systems, retained a logistics centre at Brooklands until 2020.

In November 2009, Brooklands was featured in an episode of a BBC TV series James May's Toy Stories. May undertook the task of recreating the original track using Scalextric. The show featured May's attempt to lay the plastic track through and around the variety of obstacles that have replaced the original track, including a pond, a four-lane road, several houses, fences, and Sony and Procter & Gamble corporate campuses.

== Brooklands Museum ==
In 1987, Brooklands Museum Trust was formed with Sir Peter G Masefield as Chairman, and began to record, research, preserving and interpret all aspects the site's heritage. The Museum project began after a highly successful temporary exhibition about Brooklands was staged in 1977 by Elmbridge Museum in Weybridge and, with support from British Aerospace, Elmbridge Borough Council, Gallaher Ltd and many dedicated individuals, this led to the selection of a 30-acre heritage site in the northeast corner of Brooklands, by the old Paddock and Finishing Straight. As well as organising numerous aviation, motoring and other events since the mid-1980s, the Museum also staged regular fly-ins for visiting light aircraft from 1991 to 2003 using the northern half of the original tarmac runway and staffed these events with an all-volunteer team.

Brooklands made a notable TV appearance when it featured in the 1990 'The Disappearance of Mr. Davenheim' episode of Agatha Christie's Poirot, when Hercule Poirot investigates a crime committed involving a racing driver. The banking of Brooklands was also used as a 'road location' in an episode of The Bill where the CID foiled an armed robbery and resulted in a 'shoot out'. On 1 November 2015, Brooklands was featured in an episode of the British series Downton Abbey, although the scenes were actually filmed at the Goodwood Circuit. American car enthusiast Barry Meguiar (President and CEO of Meguiar's) has featured the Brooklands on his Speed Channel show Car Crazy.

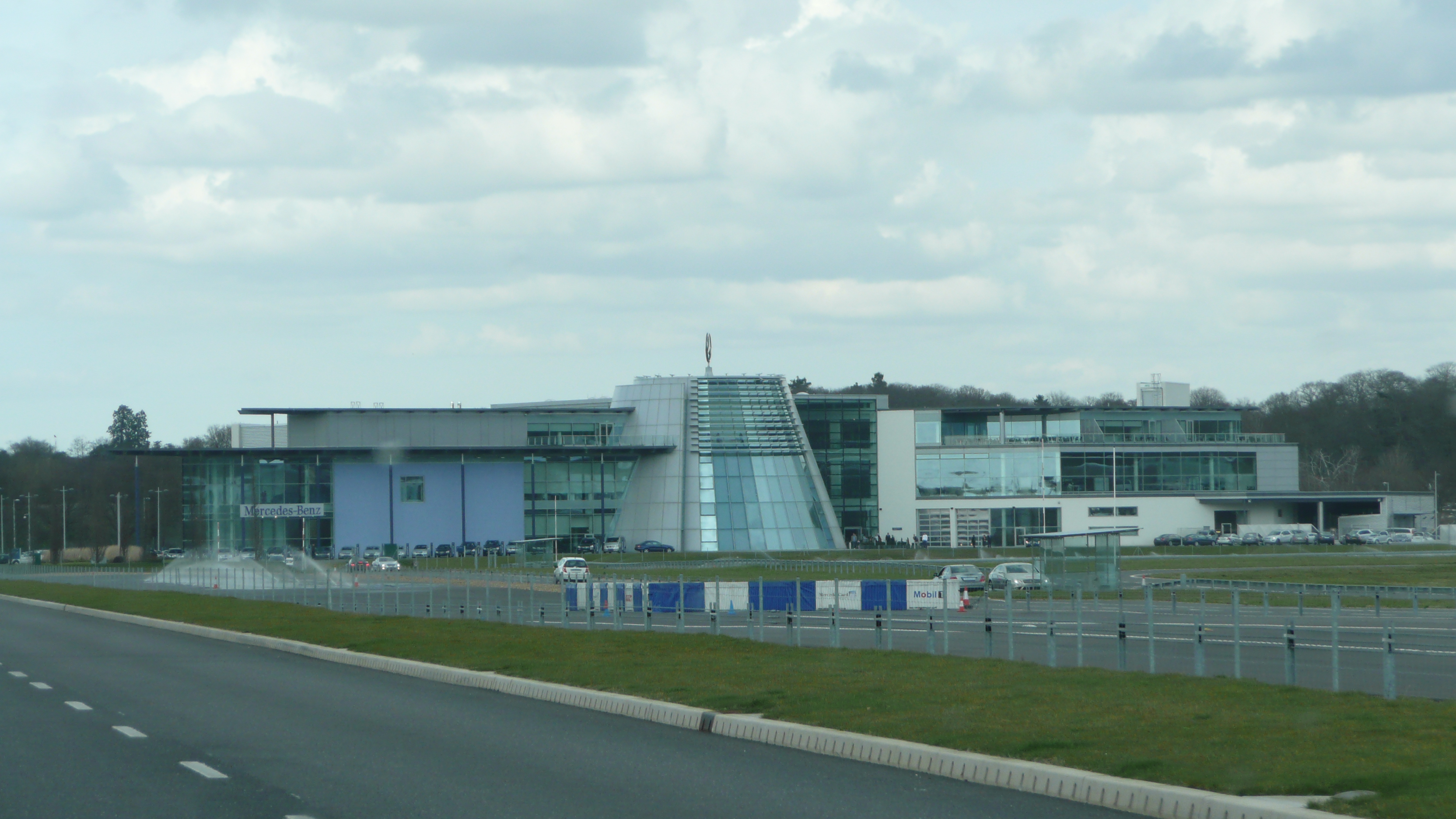
Mercedes-Benz World at Brooklands

In early 2004 the central area of Brooklands including the hard runway and parts of the remaining circuit were sold to DaimlerChrysler UK Retail and Mercedes-Benz World opened to the public on 29 October 2006. This development incorporates a vehicle test tracks (including part of the original Campbell Circuit) and an off-road circuit. Also included is a conference centre and extensive Mercedes-Benz showrooms.

Following significant earlier work by The Brooklands Society (not part of Brooklands Museum), certain buildings (including the 1907 BARC Clubhouse, the 1911 Flight Ticket Office and the 1932 Brooklands Aero Clubhouse), structures and remaining sections of the Track first became the subject of preservation orders from 1975 and this legal protection was reviewed by English Heritage and increased by the DCMS in 2002). A draft Brooklands Conservation Plan was instigated by English Heritage and prepared in 2003 for DaimlerChrysler by DCUK consultants Terence O'Rourke. A Brooklands Heritage Partnership (BHP) was formed in 2010 as an informal partnership of Brooklands Museum, Elmbridge Borough Council, English Heritage and Surrey County Council, to address increasing conservation issues and concerns. In April 2013, a £32,540 grant was secured from English Heritage (now Historic England) to enable the BHP to appoint professional consultants to research and compile a comprehensive reference document on all aspects of Brooklands' heritage. A draft version of this new document was available for public consultation via Elmbridge Borough Council and Brooklands Museum from July to August 2017.

On 25 September 2013, the last flying VC10 - an RAF K.3 tanker, serial number ZA147 (originally built as a Super VC10 airliner) - made its final flight from RAF Brize Norton to Bruntingthorpe Airfield, this being the end of the type's remarkable 51-year career. Although this aeroplane is due to be scrapped, on the previous day its sister, ZA150, was acquired by Brooklands Museum for preservation at nearby Dunsfold Aerodrome and was delivered there by an RAF 101 Squadron crew. This was the last VC10 built - first flown from Brooklands on 16 February 1970, originally delivered to East African Airways and also one of the last complete aircraft manufactured at Brooklands - the last complete aircraft to be built there, BAC 1-11 D-ANNO, first flew on 19 December 1970. The retirement of these two VC10s also ended a 100-year period of Brooklands-built aeroplanes operated by the British armed forces.

== Centenary ==
Brooklands motor course celebrated its centenary on 16/17 June 2007. Throughout 2007, various special events were organised by Brooklands Museum in order to celebrate its 100th birthday. Events included use of the Byfleet Banking for the first time in nearly 70 years, a Formula One car demonstration by McLaren-Mercedes, driven by Gary Paffett in conjunction with Mercedes-Benz World and a 24-hour slot car race to commemorate S.F. Edge's achievement of driving for 24 hours averaging over 60 mph (100 km/h).

== Legacy ==
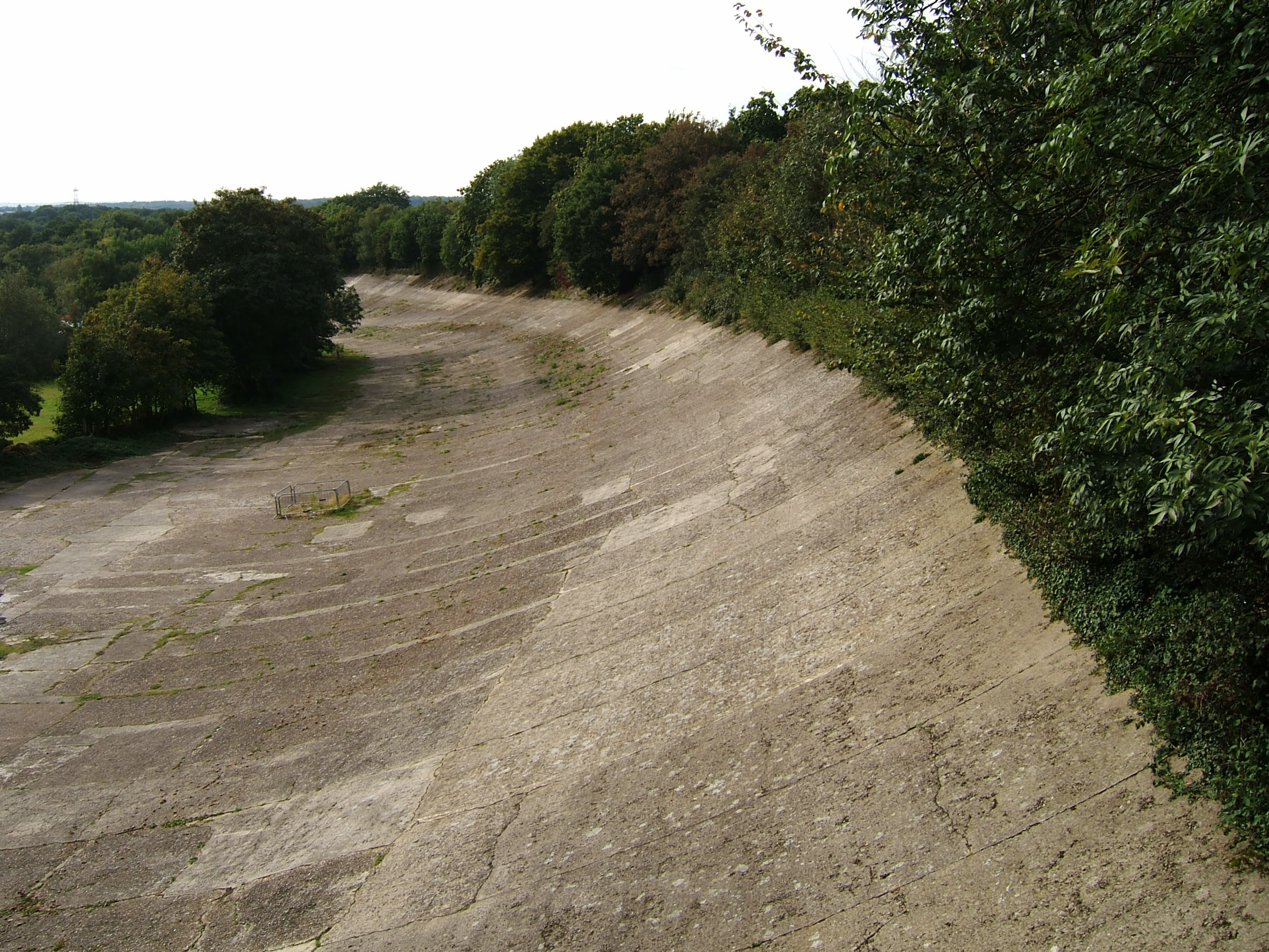
Part of The Members' Banking, 2007

Brooklands Museum houses historic aircraft including a Vickers Wellington bomber recovered from Loch Ness in 1985, a British Airways Concorde, G-BBDG (c/n 202), the UK's first production Concorde, and now also owns the 40% scale Concorde model "G-CONC" displayed for many years as a gate guardian at Heathrow Airport, until removed in 2007. After restoration and repainting, the model was relocated for similar duty at Brooklands Museum's public entrance off Brooklands Drive on 29 September 2012.

There are civil and military aircraft on display including a Vickers Vanguard, Viscount 800 and Standard VC10. The majority of exhibits were built at Brooklands or have close associations with the site. The VC10 was built and first flown at Brooklands in 1964 and after airline service with British United as G-ASIX and later British Caledonian Airways, in 1974 it became a VIP aircraft for the then-Sultan Qaboos of Oman until retired on 6 July 1987 and donated to Brooklands Museum by the Sultan's Royal Flight.

Although the Circuit is no longer driveable, it can still be simulated in the 1999 released Spirit of Speed 1937 game for the PC and Dreamcast, in which it was re-created in detail. Several other video games also feature Brooklands and Brooklands Museum's Formula 1 simulator also features a detailed computer simulation of the pre-war race track.

In 2009, BBC Top Gear presenter James May announced plans to recreate the full length Brooklands using Scalextric track and cars. This was undertaken with a team of 350 volunteers building the track from an uncounted number of pieces of Scalextric track, navigating ponds and roads, closely following the route of the old Brooklands track. This event broke the Guinness World Record for the longest ever Scalextric track in the world, intended to measure the original 2.75 miles (4.43 km) of the original Brooklands circuit but in reality recording 2.95 miles (4.75 km) in length (due to the need to navigate modern features that block the original course). The episode was shown on BBC2 on 17 November 2009 as part of James May's Toy Stories.

BBC TV's Antiques Roadshow was filmed at Brooklands Museum in July 2009 and subsequently produced as two programmes for its next series and first broadcast on 10 and 17 January 2010.

Apart from Brooklands Museum's displays and exhibits, today there are a number of memorials to Brooklands. The first of these is the 'Brooklands Memorial' built by Vickers-Armstrongs to mark the 50th anniversary of the opening of the Motor Course and was unveiled by Lord Brabazon of Tara in July 1957. This impressive concrete faced monument featured a fine bronze letters, plaque and related inscription summarising the site's history from 1907–57 and was originally located at the North end of the aerodrome, was designated as a Scheduled Monument in 2002 then relocated and restored in a new position just east of the River Wey on the museum site to make way for the new Mercedes-Benz World complex, which opened in 2006. The original bronze fittings were stolen in the 1970s but the plaque was later found and is now displayed in the main entrance foyer of the former BARC Clubhouse.

A memorial dedicated to Brooklands aircraft design and manufacturing heritage was specially designed and manufactured by British Aerospace in the late 1980s to mark the closing of its last factory there. This takes the form of a large engraved acrylic panel displayed at the southern end of the old runway close to the entrance to the Community Park and a children's nursery. Forgotten and overgrown until quite recently, this has now been rediscovered and is still in good condition.

Another initiative was taken in the early 1990s by the developers Trafalgar Brookmount Ltd who commissioned an artist to design and produce two large brown terracotta 'gate statements'; these are located at the east end of Wellington Way and the south end of Sopwith Drive and feature representative images of Brooklands' pre-1940 history namely the Napier-Railton, Vickers Vimy and the two former Clubhouses.

In 1993, Prince Michael of Kent officially opened a new Garden of Memories at Brooklands Museum which features a growing number of commemorative plaques in memory of many people who have been associated with Brooklands for more than 100 years.

Much of the novel Kingdom Come, published in 2006 by the author J. G. Ballard, is set in Brooklands.

In February 2015, it was announced that Brooklands would receive a multimillion-pound facelift. The £4.68 million Heritage Lottery Fund grant funded an £8.5 million Brooklands Aircraft Factory and Race Track Revival Project. This resulted in the relocation and restoration of the Grade II Listed 1940 Bellman Hangar complete with a comprehensive new "Aircraft Factory" exhibition inside, as well as construction of a new two-storey Flight Shed housing archives and a workshop on the ground floor with another aircraft exhibition hall above. Restoration of the Northern section of the adjacent Finishing Straight was also part of the scheme and included revealing its largely intact 'lost' section under the hangar's post-war floor. The project was successfully completed and officially opened to the public by Prince Michael of Kent on 13 November 2017.

2017 also saw the completion of a new Brooklands Conservation Management Plan (funded by English Heritage - now Historic England) for the Brooklands Heritage Partnership and among other things, this document set new standards for maintaining and, where practical or necessary, for repairing the surviving sections of the historic Race Track. Further grant aid from Historic England in 2018 enabled an experienced contractor to clear several extensive undergrowth from the largely and seriously neglected western section of the Byfleet Banking. In February 2020, the Byfleet Banking's central section was also successfully cleared of leaves, moss and weeds for its owners Marks & Spencer and Tesco.

== Notable people ==
- Woolf Barnato (racing driver)
- Diana Barnato Walker (pilot)
- R. Harold Barnwell (flying instructor and test pilot)
- Francis Beart (racing motorcyclist)
- Oliver Bertram (racing driver and Barrister-at-Law)
- Tim Birkin (racing driver)
- Florence Blenkiron (first woman to lap Brooklands at over 100 mph, first person to cross Sahara desert on a motorbike)
- Bill Boddy (motoring journalist)
- Sir Redvers Buller, on the first committee
- P. W. S. 'George' Bulman (test pilot)
- Sydney Camm (aircraft designer)
- Sir Malcolm Campbell (racing driver)
- Jean Chassagne (racing driver)
- John Cobb (racing driver)
- Samuel Franklin Cody (pioneer aviator)
- Sir Billy Cotton (big band leader, entertainer, racing driver and pilot)
- Bert Denley (racing motorcyclist)
- Freddie Dixon (racing driver)
- Kaye Don (racing driver)
- Sir George R. F. Edwards (key figure in Vickers and later BAC)
- Eric Gordon England (pioneer aviator, aircraft designer/engineer and racing driver)
- Ernest Eldridge (racing driver)
- George Eyston (racing driver)
- Dudley Froy (racing driver and pilot)
- Claude Grahame-White (pioneer aviator)
- The Duke of Westminster, on the first committee
- Frank Halford (engineer)
- Edward Ramsden Hall (racing driver)
- Gustav Hamel (pioneer aviator)
- Harry Hawker (pioneer aviator, aircraft designer/engineer and test pilot)
- Hilda Hewlett (pioneer aviator, flying instructor and industrialist)
- Bernard Laurence Hieatt (racing motorcyclist)
- Johnny Hindmarsh (test pilot and racing driver)
- Percy E. Lambert (racing driver)
- Hugh F. Locke King (founder)
- Archie Low (flying instructor, test pilot and aircraft designer)
- Lord Lonsdale
- Sir Peter G. Masefield (journalist, pilot, airline executive and industrialist)
- Lord Montagu
- Richard G. J. Nash (racing driver and pioneer transport preservationist)
- Kishichiro Okura (racing driver, competed in the first ever car race held at Brooklands)
- Ron R. Paine (aircraft engineer, pilot and airline executive)
- J. G. Parry-Thomas (engineer and racing driver)
- Louis Paulhan (pioneer aviator)
- Adolphe Pégoud (pioneer aviator)
- Henry Petre (flying instructor, aircraft designer and Australia's first military aviator)
- Kay Petre (racing driver)
- Rex Pierson (aircraft designer and engineer)
- Howard Pixton (test pilot)
- John Cyril Porte (pioneer aviator, flying boat designer and test pilot)
- James Radley (pioneer aviator and racing driver)
- Joan Richmond (Australian racing driver, winner of 1932 British 1000 Miles Race, held at Brooklands)
- Henry Segrave (racing driver)
- Beatrice Shilling (engineer and motorcyclist)
- Fred Sigrist (test pilot)
- Thomas Sopwith (pioneer aviator, aircraft designer and industrialist)
- George E. Stanley (racing motorcyclist)
- Dr Desmond Stanley Hayton-Williams (pioneering surgeon)
- Joseph 'Mutt' Summers (test pilot)
- Prince Francis of Teck, on the first committee
- Brian Trubshaw (test pilot)
- Bert le Vack (racing motorcyclist)
- Alliott Verdon-Roe (pioneer aviator, aircraft designer and industrialist)
- Sir Barnes Wallis (engineer)
- Jack Warner (actor, entertainer & racing driver)
- Ann Welch (née Douglas) (pilot)
- Count Louis Zborowski (racing driver)
- Count Theodore Zichy (pilot and racing driver)

== Gallery ==
Brooklands Museum exhibits

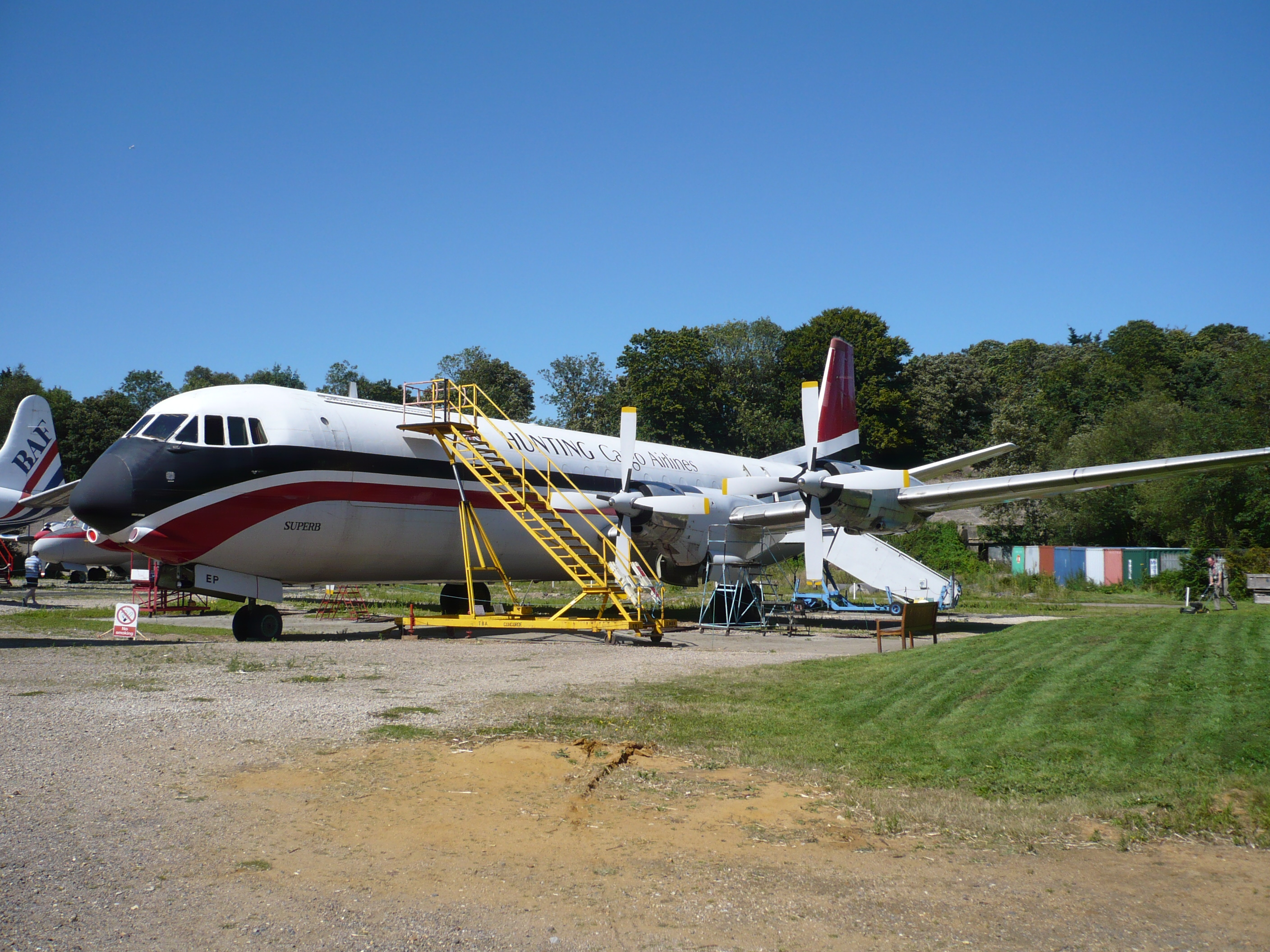
Vickers Vanguard - G-APEP

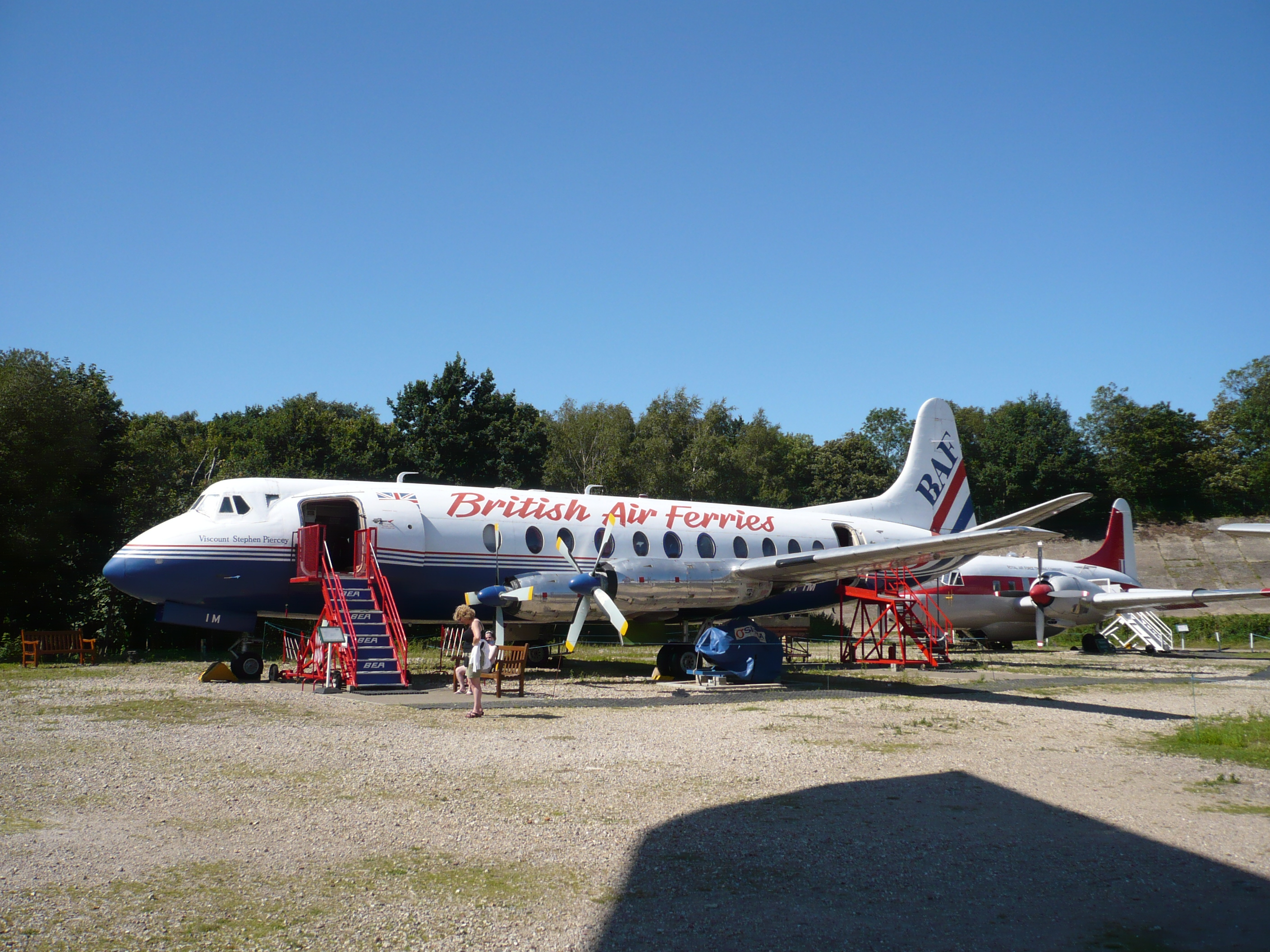
Vickers Viscount 800 - G-APIM

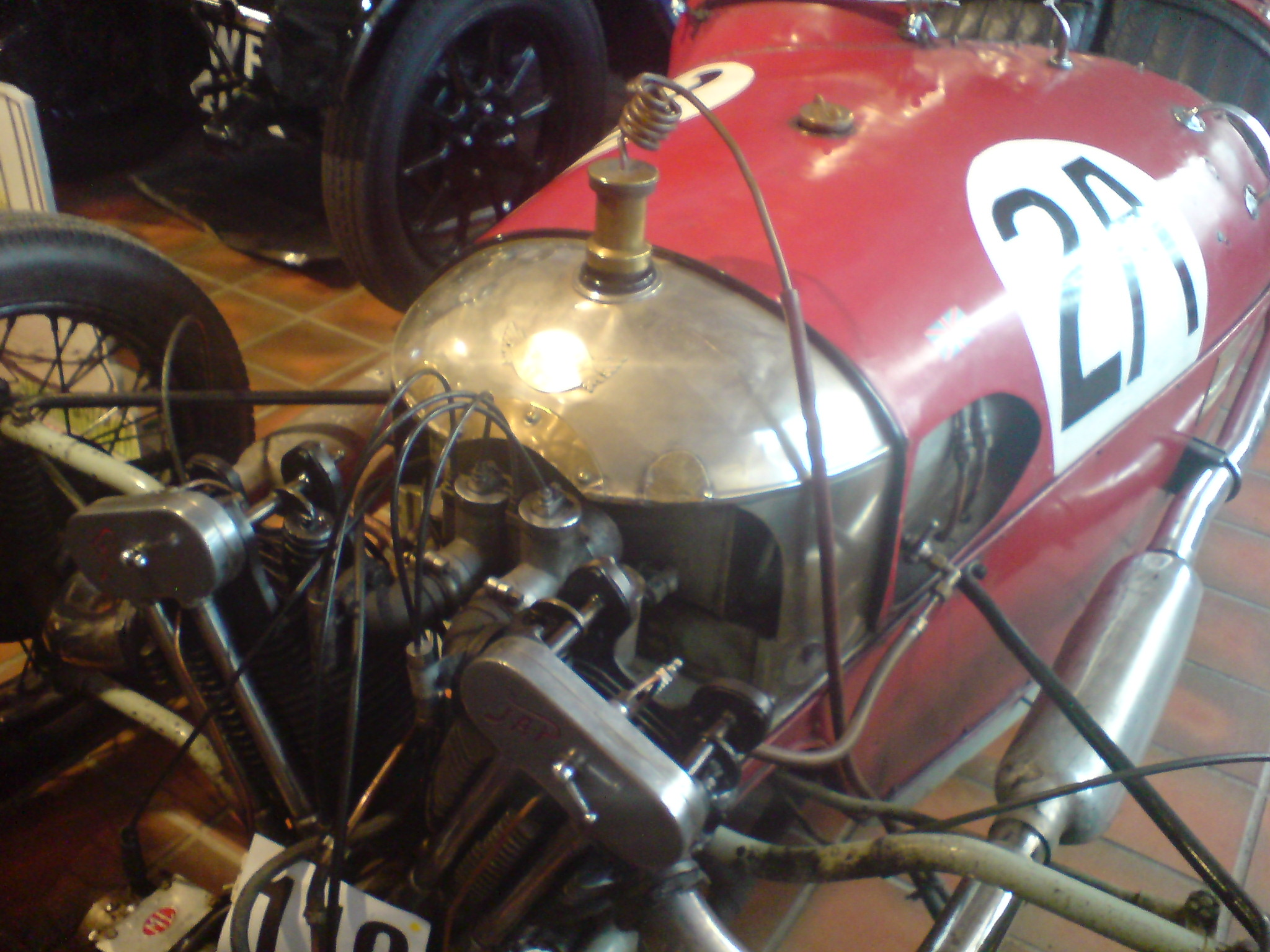
Engine of a Morgan three-wheeler

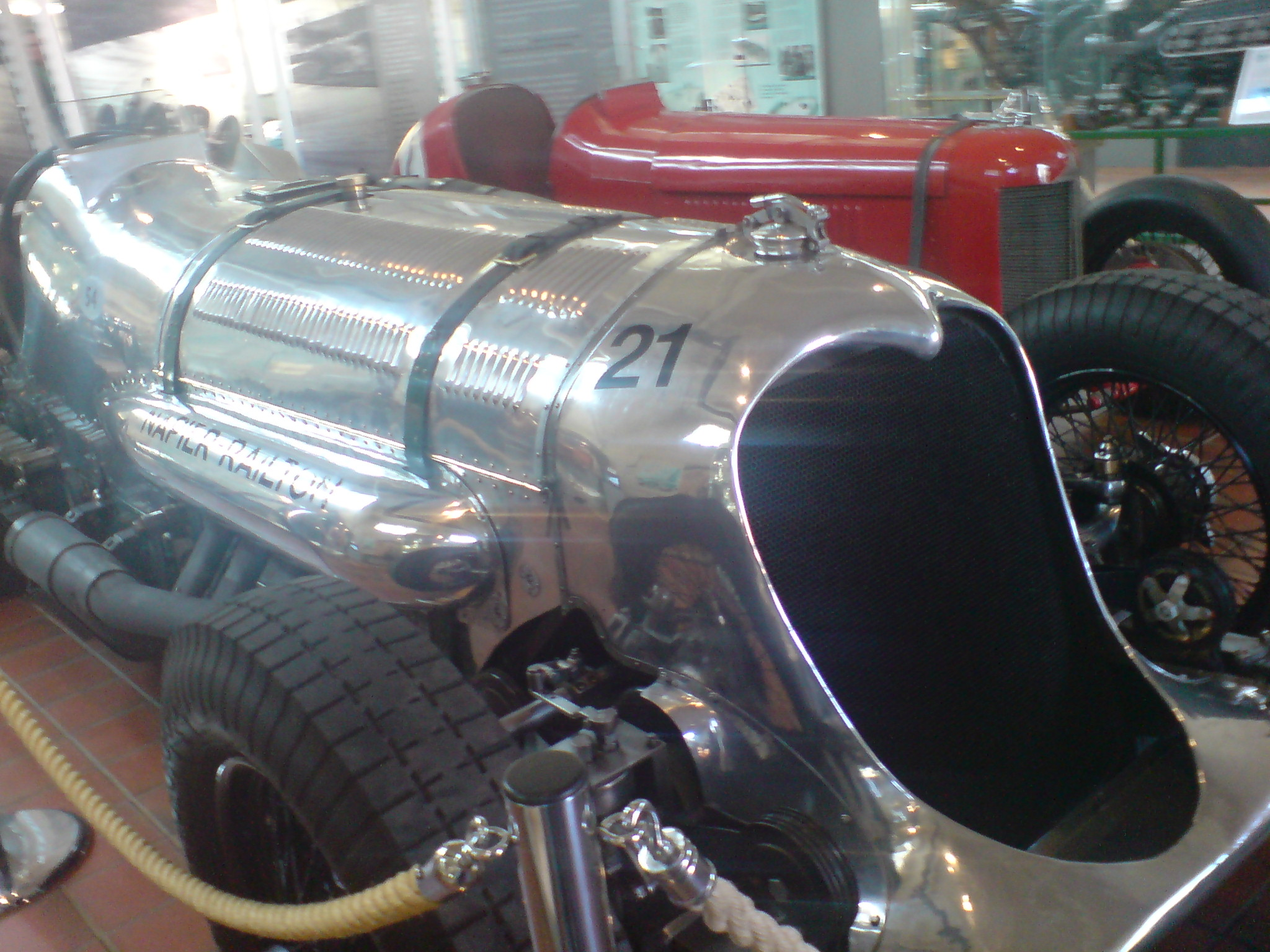
The Napier Railton

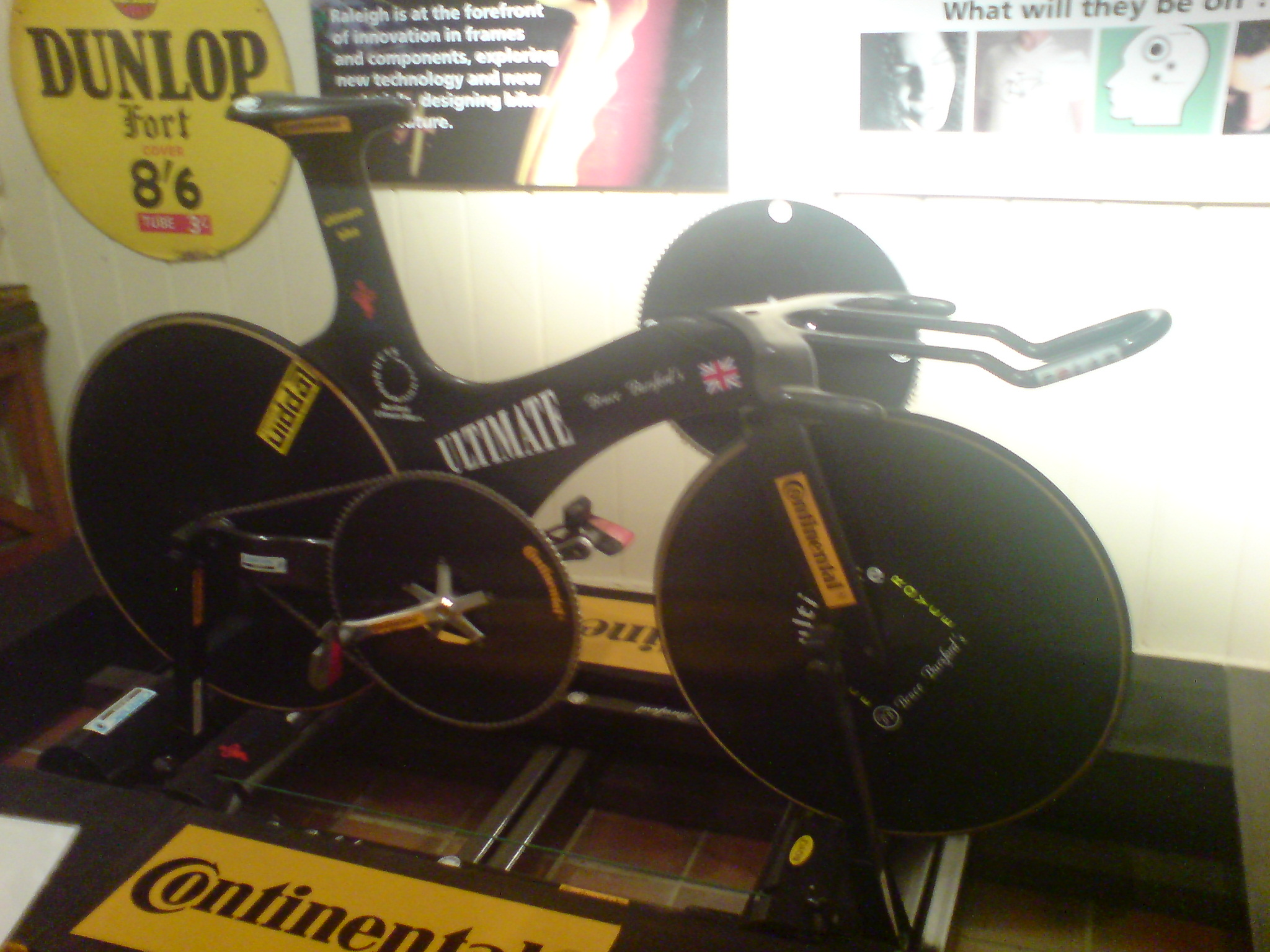
Record-breaking bicycle

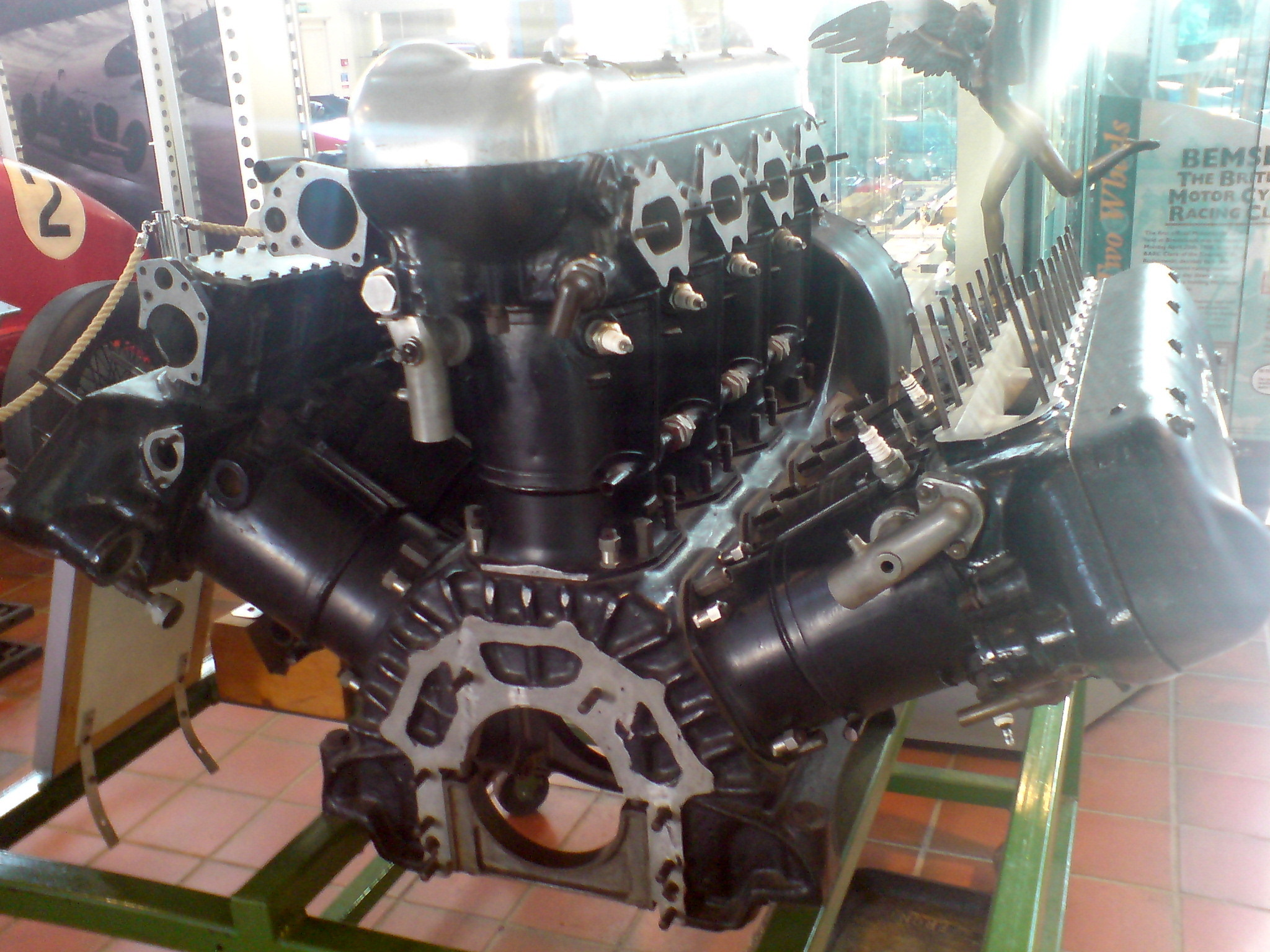
A Napier Lion

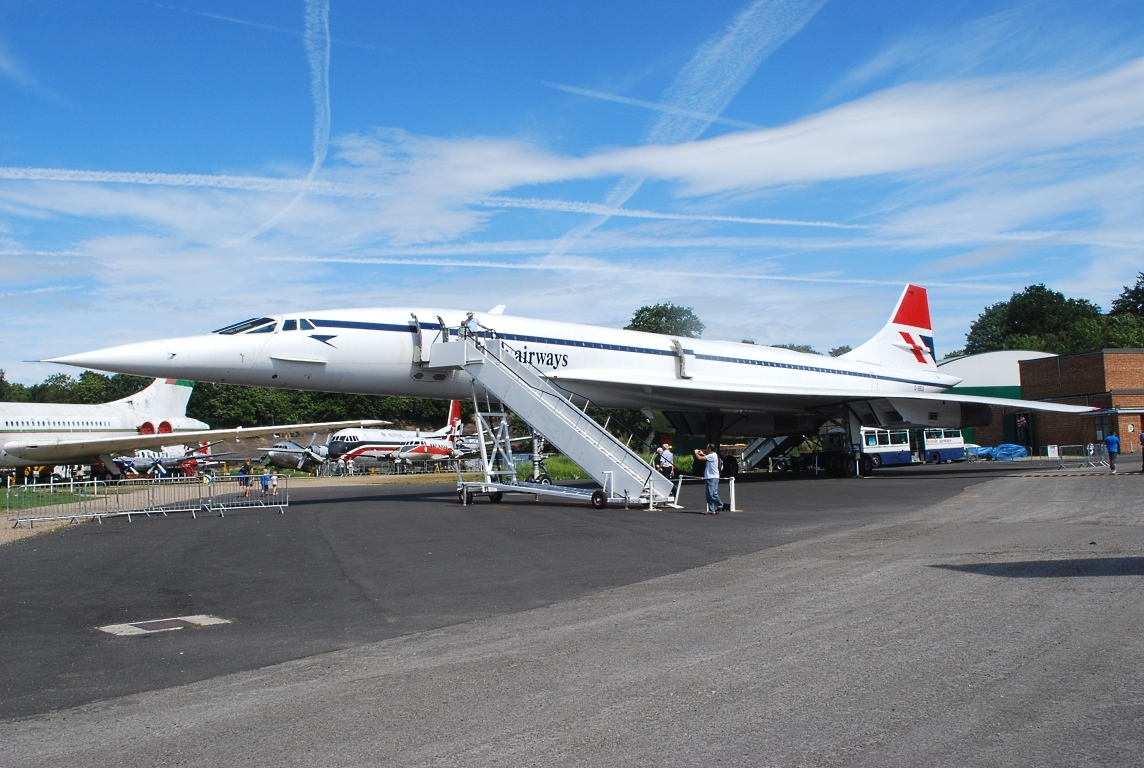
Concorde G-BBDG on display

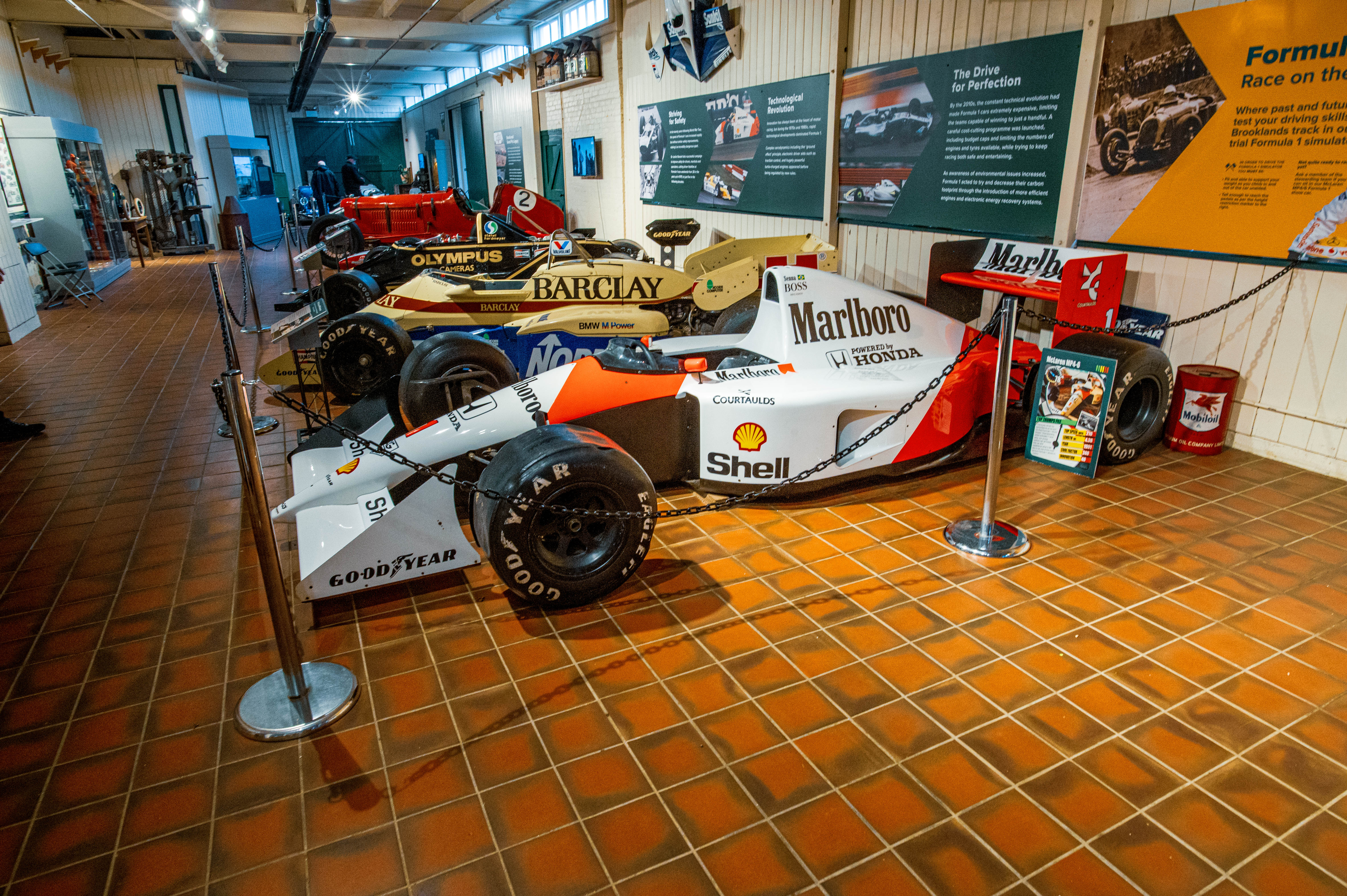
Jackson Shed, hosting historic F1 cars including a McLaren MP4/6 showcar

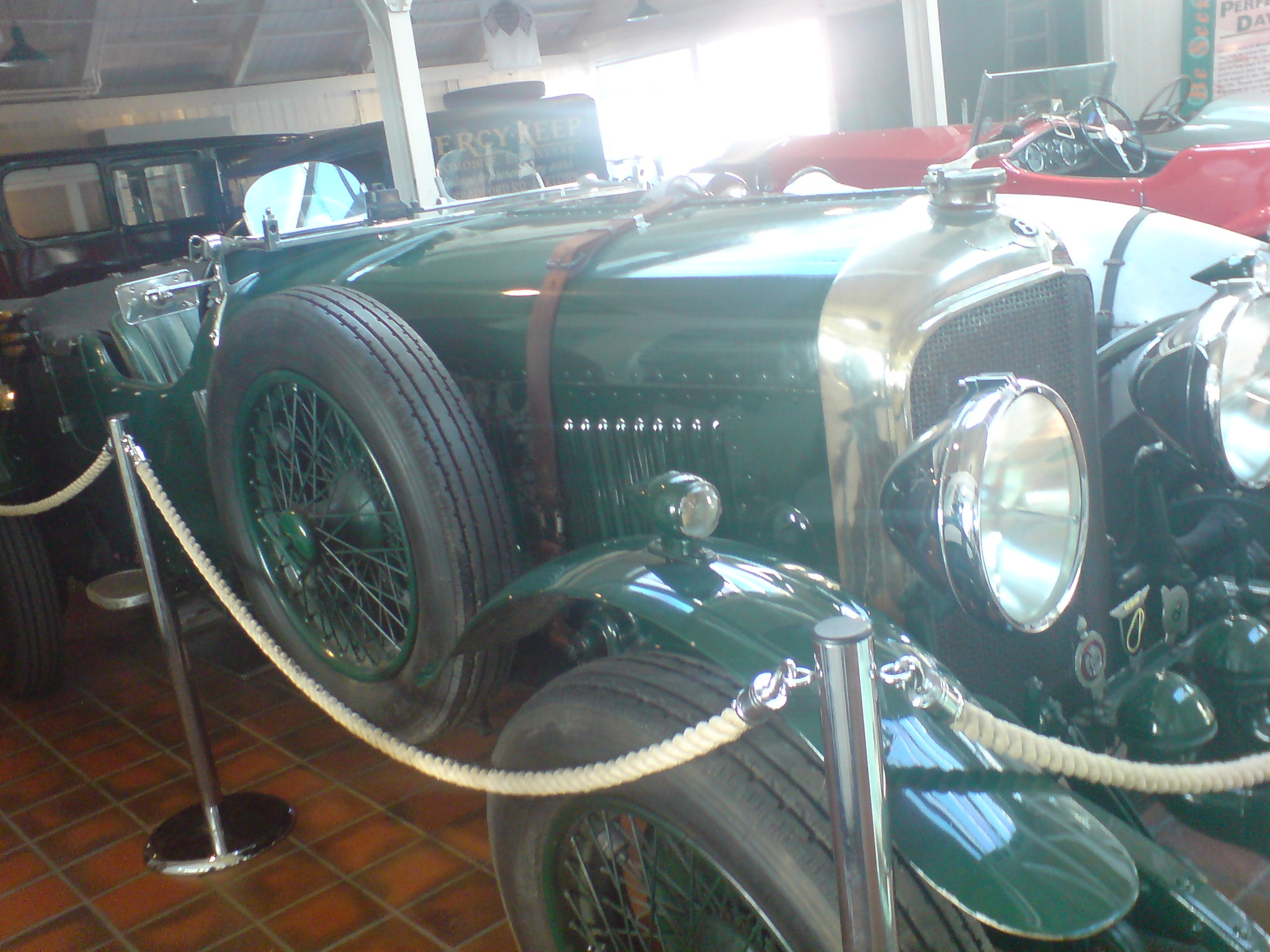
1929 Bentley 4½ Litre with a Vanden Plas body. It was originally supplied with racing Le Mans bodywork and competed in the first Double 12 event driven by its owner, H. N. Holder, alongside Henry Birkin: perhaps the best-known British driver of the 1920s and early 1930s.
