= List of pilots awarded an Aviator's Certificate by the Royal Aero Club in 1913 =

The Royal Aero Club issued Aviators Certificates from 1910. These were internationally recognised under the Fédération Aéronautique Internationale.

== List ==
Aviator's Certificates awarded
in 1910 (1–38)	in 1911 (39–168)	in 1912 (169–382)	in 1913 (383–719)	in 1914 (720–1032)

Legend

Individual was killed in an aviation accident.
Individual was killed flying in military action.

Royal Aero Club certificates awarded in 1913 (nos. 383–719)
No.	Name	Date	Comment
383	Lt. 'Georges Negresco': lt. av. Gheorghe Negrescu	7 January 1913	(1887–1977) locotenentul aviator. Romanian, Bristol Monoplane at the Bristol School, Salisbury Plain. Qualified as an engineer and retired a General. Romanian Air Force squadron Flotila 70 Aviație is named after the Generalul aviator inginer Gheorghe Negrescu.
384	Walter Featherstone	7 January 1913	Bristol Monoplane at the Bristol School, Salisbury Plain.
385	Lt. George Eardley Todd, Welsh Regiment	7 January 1913	Bristol Biplane at the Bristol School, Brooklands.
386	Lt. Gilbert W. Mapplebeck, King's Regiment	7 January 1913	Took part in the first R.F.C. reconnaissance flight of World War I from Maubeuge, Belgium on 19 August 1914. Philip Joubert de la Ferté in a Bleriot of No. 3 Squadron RFC and Lt GW Mapplebeck in a B.E.2 of No. 4 Squadron RFC.
387	Lt. John (Jack) Empson, 4th Royal Fusiliers	7 January 1913	Bristol Biplane at the Bristol School, Brooklands, died 15 May 1914
388	Arthur Ewing RN	7 January 1913	Bristol Biplane at the Bristol School, Brooklands
389	Capt. David Watson Powell, Northamptonshire Regiment	7 January 1913	Bristol Biplane at the Bristol School, Brooklands
390	Gordon Noel Humphreys	7 January 1913	Caudron Biplane at Brooklands, later served with the Royal Flying Corps
391	Lt. A. B. Thompson, East Lancashire Regiment	7 January 1913	–
392	Lt. Lionel W. B. Rees RGA	7 January 1913	Rees was later awarded the Victoria Cross flying the De Havilland DH.2.
393	Engine Room Artificer Sidney T. Freeman RN	21 January 1913	–
394	Leading Seaman Bernard John William Brady RN	21 January 1913	–
395	Leading Seaman Arthur John Bateman RN	21 January 1913	–
396	Sub.-Lt. Arthur Wellesley Bigsworth RNR	21 January 1913	Awarded the D.S.O. for an attack on a Zeppelin on 17 May 1915 and a bar to his D.S.O. on 19 September 1915 "for his services in destroying singlehandedly a German submarine on the morning of August 26th, 1915, by bombs dropped from an aeroplane." He was also mentioned in despatches. Some claim that Bigsworth inspired W. E. Johns' character 'Bigglesworth' (Biggles).
397	Lt. F W Bowhill RN	21 January 1913	Later air chief marshal.
398	Lt. Alexander Claud Garden Brown RN	21 January 1913	1890–1919 Bristol Biplane at Eastbourne, later Royal Air Force. Died of wounds 6 May 1918 in France while serving with 48 Squadron RAF, had been wounded on a reconnaissance flight on 3 May 1918.
399	Lt. Alexander Shekleton, Royal Munster Fusiliers	21 January 1913	–
400	Capt. Gilbert Braithwaite Rickards, late Royal Munster Fusiliers	21 January 1913	–
401	Henry Elliot William Macandrew	21 January 1913	–
402	Assistant-Paymaster John Henry Lidderdale RN	21 January 1913	–
403	Sub.-Lt. Reginald Leonard George Marix RNVR	21 January 1913	(1889–1966) Royal Naval Air Service, later Royal Air Force where he reached the rank of Air Vice Marshal. The first aviator to destroy a Zeppelin from an aircraft in 1914.
404	Lt. If. D. Vernon RN	21 January 1913	–
405	Sub. Lt. H. A. Littleton RNVR	21 January 1913	–
406	A. L. Russell	21 January 1913	–
407	Evelyn Ronald Whitehouse	21 January 1913	1894–1979 Deperdussin Monoplane at Hendon, later Royal Naval Air Service then Royal Air Force.
408	Lt. J. T. Babington RN	21 January 1913	One of three Avro 504A pilots who carried out the bombing raid on the Zeppelin Base at Friedrichshafen on 21 November 1914. Later worked as a test pilot for Handley-Page. Remained in the RAF until 1944, retired with the rank of Air Marshal. Died in 1979.
409	Horace A. Buss	4 February 1913	–
410	Montague F. Glew	4 February 1913	–
411	Hubert Scott	4 February 1913	–
412	Air Mechanic Reginald Collis	4 February 1913	–
413	Christopher Nevile	4 February 1913	–
414	Capt. E. G. R. Lithgow RAMC	4 February 1913	–
415	Assistant Paymaster E. B. Parker RN	18 February 1913	–
416	Lt. M. W. Noel	18 February 1913	–
417	2nd-Lt. R. M. Vaughan, Royal Inniskilling Fusiliers	18 February 1913	–
418	Harold Thomas Gardiner Lane	18 February 1913	1891–1919 Bristol Biplane at Brooklands
419	Frederick Frank Reilly Minchin	18 February 1913	1890–1927 Bristol Biplane at Eastbourne, disappeared in 1927 over the Atlantic Ocean in Fokker F.VIIa St. Raphael.
420	J. Crawford Kehrmann	18 February 1913	–
421	Capt. William Geoffrey Hanson Salmond RFA	18 February 1913	–
422	Lt. R. P. Ross RN	18 February 1913	–
423	Lt. James Robert Branch Kennedy RN	18 February 1913	Died on 13 June 1913, as passenger of C. Gordon Bell, at Brooklands in a Martinsyde monoplane.
424	George Lee Temple	18 February 1913	Died when he crashed in a Blériot monoplane at Hendon on 25 January 1914. The Royal Aero Club's Accident Investigation Committee's Report N. 19 stated that "the condition of the pilot's health, as disclosed by the medical evidence, coupled with the fact of the gradual turning over of the aircraft in its descent to the ground, point to the pilot having lost consciousness just before or at the commencement of the dive, and that this loss of consciousness and control was the cause of the accident."
425	Lt. D. A. Oliver RN	18 February 1913	–
426	Lt. Thomas Scholes Creswell RMLI	18 February 1913	Lt. Creswell died, together with his passenger, Commander Rice, near Calshot when his seaplane (RNAS Serial no. 128) entered a dive from which he was unable to recover, hitting the water vertically at high speed. A witness, C. Gordon Bell, attested to the fact that the left wing started to break up before the aircraft hit the water. A verdict of 'accidental death from drowning' was recorded.
427	Lt. L. L. MacLean, Gurkha Rifles	18 February 1913	–
428	Jules Teulade-Cabanes	18 February 1913	–
429	Lt. R. G. D. Small, Leinster Regiment	18 February 1913	–
430	Julian B. Hall	18 February 1913	–
431	Lt. Charles Frederick Lee, King's Royal Rifles	18 February 1913	Commanded the British Aviation Mission to the United States during the War. Killed in an accident at Weston-super-Mare, 1 September 1919.
432	Percy Maxwell Muller	18 February 1913	–
433	Wallace Prowse Hodgson	18 February 1913	–
434	2nd Lt. R. A. Archer RFA	4 March 1913	–
435	2nd Lt. Lanoe Hawker RE	4 March 1913	Awarded Victoria Cross for engaging three German aircraft on 25 July 1915. Killed in dogfight with Manfred von Richthofen on 23 November 1916.
436	2nd Lt. D. J. McMullen RE	4 March 1913	–
437	Lt. C. E. H. Rathborne RMLI	4 March 1913	Later air commodore
438	Sgt. William George Stafford	18 March 1913	–
439	Sgt. Edward J. Street	18 March 1913	–
440	Lt. Llewelyn C. Hordern	18 March 1913	–
441	2nd Lt. Charles G. G. Bayly RE	18 March 1913	Pilot in No 5 Sqn. Along with his pilot on the day, 2nd Lt. Vincent Waterfall (RAeC 461), was shot down and killed nr Enghien, Belgium on 22 August 1914 while on a reconnaissance flight. They were the first RFC officers to be killed in action. Both buried in the CWGC Cemetery in Tournai, Belgium. There is a memorial to them nr Labliau next to the site where their plane was brought down.
442	Eardley H. Lawford	18 March 1913	–
443	Sgt. H. E. Vagg	18 March 1913	–
444	Sgt. Joseph Kemper	1 April 1913	–
445	1st Class Air Mechanic J. C. McNamara	1 April 1913	–
446	Leading Seaman Philip Ephraim Bateman RN	1 April 1913	–
447	Lt. Raymond Fitzmaurice RN	1 April 1913	–
448	Lt. W. F. Robertson Dobie	1 April 1913	–
449	Cmdr. Neville Usborne RNAS	1 April 1913	Used a Caudron Biplane at the Ewen School, Hendon. Died 21 February 1916 in an early parasite fighter experiment
450	Lt. Guy Blatherwick RN	1 April 1913	–
451	Lt. Wilfrid Picton-Warlow	1 April 1913	(1888–1914) Served with the Royal Flying Corps, killed in a flying accident on 20 December 1914 in a Blériot while returning home on leave from France to England.
452	Arthur B. Ashford Thomson	1 April 1913	–
453	Engine Room Artificer Herbert Hackney RN	31 March 1913	–
454	Capt. G. W. Vivian RN	31 March 1913	–
455	Leading Seaman G. R. Athlon	1 April 1913	–
456	Sgt. H. C. Wright RFC	1 April 1913	–
457	Lt. T. W. Mulcahy-Morgim, Royal Irish Fusiliers	12 April 1913	–
458	J. H. A. Landon	12 April 1913	–
459	J. H. G. Torr	17 April 1913	–
460	Sub-Lt. R. E. C. Peirse RNVR	22 April 1913	Later air chief marshal.
461	2nd Lt. V. Waterfall, East Yorks Regt.	22 April 1913	Using a Vickers Biplane at the Vickers School, Brooklands. Pilot in No 5 Sqn. Along with his observer, Lt. Charles George Gordon Bayly, was shot down and killed nr Enghien, Belgium on 22 August 1914 while on a reconnaissance flight. They were the first RFC officers (and 2nd Lt. V Waterfall the first pilot) to be killed in action. Both buried in the CWGC Cemetery in Tournai, Belgium. There is a memorial to them nr Labliau next to the site where their plane was brought down.
462	Richard Norton Wight	22 April 1913	R.N.Wight, flying an Avro Tractor Biplane for the first time, crashed following a side-slip while doing a circuit at Shoreham Aerodrome. Wight survived the crash but was unable to free himself from the wreckage before the fuel from the ruptured fuel tank caught fire; those on the scene pulled him free, but he subsequently died "from the effects of the fire".
463	2nd Lt. W. R. Read, KDG	12 Apr 1913	–
464	Sgt. Harold Victor Robbins	22 April 1913	–
465	Shipwright D. Shaw RN	23 April 1913	–
466	H. C. Tower	23 April 1913	–
467	Sgt. William Robert Bruce	23 April 1913	–
468	Com. Francis Rowland Scarlett RN	24 April 1913	First commandant of the RAF's No. 1 School of Technical Training
469	Lt. Francis John Leslie Cogan RFA	30 April 1913	–
470	2nd Lt. Roger Marshall RFA (Reserve)	30 April 1913	–
471	2nd Lt. Montagu Reaney Chidson RGA	30 April 1913	–
472	2nd Lt. Cyril Cordon Hosking RFA	30 April 1913	–
473	Harry Stewart	30 April 1913	–
474	Thomas Alfred Rainey	30 May 1913	–
475	Sgt. John Mead	30 May 1913	–
476	Laurance Hugh Strain	30 May 1913	–
477	Frank George Andreae	5 May 1913	–
478	Major Neville John Gordon Cameron, Cameron Highlanders	6 May 1913	–
479	Lt. Ulick John Deane Bourke, 52nd Light Infantry	9 May 1913	–
480	John George Barron	10 May 1913	–
481	Lt. Francis George Brodribb RN	13 May 1913	Died in 1958 after being trapped in a machine in his laundry.
482	Robert Arthur King	16 May 1913	–
483	Lt. William Gore Sutherland Mitchell, 1st Highland Light Infantry	17 May 1913	Became Air Chief Marshal and was the first RAF officer to hold the post of Black Rod.
484	Major George Charleton Merrick RGA	17 May 1913	Major Merrick was flying a Short Biplane at the Central Flying School, Upavon, on 3 October 1913. When at a height of about 300 ft. he was observed to be descending at a very steep angle. Shortly after this, he fell out and was killed. The aircraft turned on its back and landed gently. Accident Report No. 18 considered that the accident was "due primarily to the pilot forcing the aircraft down at too steep an angle, resulting in his falling forward on his control and accentuating the steepness of the descent." It also drew attention to the fact that the pilot was not strapped in and thought it was "quite possible that, in this particular instance, had he been so, the accident might have been averted."
485	Rene Louis Desoutter	19 May 1913	Brother of Marcel Desoutter
486	Lt. Greville Edward Gordon McClellan, Worcestershire Regiment	20 May 1913	–
487	Manuel Zubiaga	20 May 1913	–
488	Tone Hippolyte Bayetto	22 May 1913	(1892–1918) Blériot Monoplane at the Grahame-White School, Hendon. An engineer who later joined the Royal Flying Corps as a Sergeant pilot, commissioned as a 2nd Lieutenant in 1916. Injured when his Sopwith Pup was shot down by enemy aircraft and badly injured returned to England in 1917. Back on flying duties he was killed on 28 July 1918 when the wings of his Sopwith Dolphin E4449 folded back and it dived into the ground from 200 feet.
489	Shipwright Charles Victor Lacey RN	23 May 1913	–
490	Staff-Surgeon Hardy Vesey Wells RN	24 May 1913	–
491	Richard Orr Paterson	24 May 1913	–
492	Lt. Paul Augustine Broder, 5th Worcestershire Regiment	26 May 1913	–
493	Pierre Gandillon	26 May 1913	–
494	Lt. William Charles Hicks RN	27 May 1913	–
495	Lt. Gordon Adams, South Lancashire Regt.	29 May 1913	–
496	2nd Lt. A. A. Allen Knight, Royal Munster Fusiliers	29 May 1913	–
497	Capt. Francis Stuart Wilson RM	29 May 1913	–
498	Lt. Ambrose Gratton Power, Royal Munster Fusiliers	2 June 1913	–
499	Lt. Malcolm Wallace Duncan RA	2 June 1913	–
500	Assistant-Paymaster Charles Robert Finch Noyes RN	29 May 1913	–
501	Lt. H.D. Harvey-Kelly, Royal Irish Regt.	30 May 1913	First RFC pilot to land in France in the First World War. Shot down by Kurt Wolff and died of wounds in April 1917
502	Naval Shipwright George Thomas Harvey Pack	2 June 1913	–
503	Lt. Arthur Bruce Gaskell RN	2 June 1913	–
504	Reginald Hugh Carr	2 June 1913	–
505	Lt. William George Sitwell RN	3 June 1913	–
506	Frank Widenham Goodden	3 June 1913	(1889–1917) Major in the Royal Flying Corps, died testing a prototype Royal Aircraft Factory S.E.5 at Farnbrough on 28 January 1917.
507	Frank Hudson	3 June 1913	–
508	Capt. George Marshall Griffith RGA	3 June 1913	–
509	Capt. Henry Fawcett RMLI	3 June 1913	–
510	Eric Bentley Bauman	3 June 1913	–
511	Joseph Raymond de Laplane	12 June 1913	–
512	Sub-Lt. Douglas Claude Strathearn Evill RN	13 June 1913	–
513	George Lancelot Gipps	13 June 1913	In 1914 G.L.Gipps was being instructed by Frederick Warren Merriam at Brooklands when the aircraft, which was fitted with dual controls, "suddenly banked steeply and, making a quarter-turn, nose dived to the ground from a height of about 50 ft.", killing Gipps and injuring Merriam. Merriam stated at the inquiry that he was "under the impression that [Gipps] was resisting his control". The Committee recommended "that in all dual controlled machines used for instructional purposes, means should be provided whereby the instructor can instantly disconnect the passenger's control."
514	Francis Percy Adams	13 June 1913	–
515	William Birchenough	13 June 1913	–
516	Lt. Ronald Burns, Australian Commonwealth Military Forces	13 June 1913	–
517	2nd Lt. Charles Francis Beevor, 18th QMO Hussars	13 June 1913	–
518	Lt. Edward Overend Priestley RN	14 June 1913	–
519	Sgt.-Maj. Albert Fletcher	1 July 1913	Later Air Commodore in the RAF
520	Sgt.-Maj. Arthur Harold Measures	16 June 1913	–
521	Lt. George Hugh Vaus Hathorn RMLI	16 June 1913	–
522	Sgt. Charles Mullen	16 June 1913	–
523	2nd Lt. Reginald Charles Hope Bewes	17 June 1913	–
524	Sgt. Charles Edward Jarvis	17 June 1913	–
525	Major William Sefton Brancker RFA	18 June 1913	Became an Air Vice-Marshal in the Royal Air Force and Director of Civil Aviation. Died in the crash of the R101 airship in France on 5 October 1930.
526	Edwin Prosser	18 June 1913	–
527	2nd Lt. Mervyn Noott	20 June 1913	–
528	Capt. Andre Popovici	21 June 1913	Romanian
529	Lt. C. E. Maude RN	26 June 1913	–
530	Capt. Henry Hammond Shott DSO	30 June 1913	Awarded Distinguished Service Order for his services in South Africa during the Second Boer War.
531	2nd Lt. Arthur Victor Newton, Special Reserve	30 June 1913	–
532	Lt.-Col. Alexander Beamish Hamilton	30 June 1913	–
533	Lt. Augustus Willington Shelton Agar RN	25 June 1913	Awarded the Victoria Cross for an attack on the Bolshevik cruiser Oleg in Kronstadt harbour while in command of HM Coastal Motor Boat 4 on 17 June 1919.
534	Lt. Arnold John Miley RN	1 July 1913	–
535	2nd Lt. Ronald Falshaw Morkill, Special Reserve	1 July 1913	–
536	Lt. Edward Osmond RN	1 July 1913	–
537	William Thomas Warren	1 July 1913	–
538	1st Class Air-Mechanic Henry Vaughan Jerrard	2 July 1913	–
539	Capt. Arthur Charles Barnby RMLI	2 July 1913	–
540	Lt. Richard Edward Orton, 1st East Lancashire Regt.	2 July 1913	–
541	1st Class Air-Mechanic Frank Pratt	3 July 1913	–
542	Lt. Constantin Beroniade	4 July 1913	Romanian
543	Lt. Alexandru Pascanu	4 July 1913	Romanian
544	Thomas Wilfrid Elsdon	8 July 1913	–
545	Graham Elesmere Harris	8 July 1913	–
546	Sir Archibald Henry Macdonald Sinclair, Bt.	8 July 1913	–
547	2nd Lt. Albert Ernest Morgan, Special Reserve	8 July 1913	–
548	Lt. Arthur Courtney Boddam-Whetham, Reserve of Officers	8 July 1913	–
549	Sgt. Edward Ernest Porter	9 July 1913	–
550	Lt. Maurice John Ambler, 14th Hussars	10 July 1913	–
551	Lt. Henry Le Marchant Brock, Royal Warwickshire Regiment	10 July 1913	Later air commodore, RAF.
552	Willoughby Montgomery Fane Pendlebury	11 July 1913	–
553	2nd Lt. John Hugh Macdonald Stevenson	11 July 1913	–
554	Shipwright Charles Barry Snow	12 July 1913	–
555	Herbert Bradford	14 July 1913	–
556	Hubert Poyntz-Gaynor Leigh	14 July 1913	–
557	George Alfred John Blundell	14 July 1913	–
558	William Sterling Roberts	3 July 1913	–
559	1st Class Air-Mechanic Charles R. Gallie	12 July 1913	–
560	Hans Rolshoven	14 July 1913	WWI pilot in German Naval Air Station Zeebrugge, 1 October 1917, CO of Seefrontstaffel I in Nieuwmunster, killed in accident 6 May 1918
561	Col. Nevill Maskelyne Smyth VC	16 July 1913	–
562	Lt. Gordon Stuart Low RGA	16 July 1913	–
563	Robin Grey	16 July 1913	–
564	Edward Thomas Newton-Clare	17 July 1913	–
565	Bernard H. E. Howard	19 July 1913	–
566	Sub-Lt. Ian Hew Waldegrave Stair Dalrymple-Clark RNR	19 July 1913	–
567	Lt. Barry Fitzgerald Moore	21 July 1913	–
568	Robert Reginald Skene	21 July 1913	–
569	Lt. Arthur Cecil Herbert Adrian Eales IA	21 July 1913	–
570	J Capt. Bryan Charles Fairfax, Durham Light Infantry	26 July 1913	–
571	(unassigned?)	-	-
572	Able Seaman George Savill	18 July 1913	–
573	Sgt. William James Waddington	28 July 1913	–
574	E. L. M. Leveson-Gower	4 August 1913	–
575	Louis Arbon Strange	5 August 1913	–
576	Maxime Leverrier	7 August 1913	–
577	Leonhard Hubert Jagenberg	9 August 1913	–
578	S. J. V. Fill	3 August 1913	–
579	1st Class Air-Mechanic William Smith	5 August 1913	–
580	1st Class Air-Mechanic Frederick Dismore	5 August 1913	–
581	Frank Myles Temple Reilly	5 August 1913	–
582	Engine Room Artificer P. H. McCartan	6 August 1913	–
583	Sgt.-Major Albert Levick	8 August 1913	–
584	R. E. C. Penny	9 August 1913	–
585	2nd Lt. Joseph Frederick Mead, Royal Fusiliers	11 August 1913	–
586	Shipwright William Cole	13 August 1913	–
587	Capt. Henry Cholmondeley Jackson, Bedfordshire Regiment	13 August 1913	–
588	Hereward de Havilland	13 August 1913	–
589	Lt. Napier Charles Gordon Cameron, H.M. Land Forces	13 August 1913	–
590	Surgeon Frederick George Hitch RN	14 August 1913	–
591	Donald William Clappen	15 August 1913	–
592	Lt. Charles Curtis Darley RA	15 August 1913	–
593	Gordon Tsoe Kwong Wong	15 August 1913	Chinese subject
594	Engine Room Artificer William Fleetwood Shaw	15 August 1913	–
595	Capt. Lewis Pugh Evans, Black Watch	20 August 1913	–
596	Richard Crofts Powell	20 August 1913	Photos of the cover and inside pages of Powell's licence, dated 20 August 1913, can be seen here.
597	Lt. Richard Edward Lewis, West India Regt.	20 August 1913	–
598	Henry Webb	20 August 1913	–
599	Capt. Cyril Francis Murphy, 1st Royal Berkshire Regiment	20 August 1913	–
600	Second Lt. Oswyn George William Gifford Lywood	21 August 1913	Air Vice-Marshal during World War II.
601	Petty Officer James Claud Hendry RN	20 August 1913	–
602	Second Lt. B. M. B. Bateman RFA	26 August 1913	–
603	Lt. W. R. Crocker RN	28 August 1913	–
604	Sgt. F. E. Bishop RMA	28 August 1913	–
605	Lt. Lord George Wellesley, Grenadier Guards	28 August 1913	–
606	Lt. S. W. Smith, RFA (SR)	29 August 1913	–
607	Second Lt. Lord E. A. Grosvenor, H.M. Land Forces	29 August 1913	–
608	Capt. Cyril Percy Downer, Northants Regt.	29 August 1913	Died 10 March 1914 in an accident on Salisbury Plain while flying Vickers-built B.E.2 biplane no. 453 from the Central Flying School at RAF Upavon. The Public Safety and Accident Investigation Committee of the Royal Aero Club found that the accident was "solely due to the steep and protracted descent of the aircraft followed by an attempt, due to inexperience, to flatten out too suddenly when descending at an excessive speed."
609	Capt. L. E. O. Charlton, Lancashire Fusiliers	29 August 1913	–
610	J. C. Joubert de la Ferté	29 August 1913	–
611	Armourer's Mate Rowland Harper RN	29 August 1913	–
612	Capt. B. D. Fisher, 17th Lancers	30 August 1913	–
613	The Hon. F. W. L. Vernon	30 August 1913	–
614	Joseph James Bland	30 August 1913	(Hydro-aeroplane)
615	2nd Lt. Howard Bertie Strong, Queen's Royal West Surrey Regiment	3 September 1913	–
616	John William Wilfred Slack	8 September 1913	–
617	Vivian Gaskell Blackburn	10 September 1913	–
618	Walter Hugh Stewart Garnett	10 September 1913	–
619	2nd Lt. Lambert Playfair, Royal Scots	11 September 1913	–
620	Lt. Nevile Morris Jenkins RA	11 September 1913	–
621	Lt. Hyacinth Joseph Albert Roche, Royal Munster Fusiliers	12 September 1913	–
622	Capt. Arthur James Ellis, South Wales Borderers	12 September 1913	–
623	Lt. Jack Armand Cuningham RFA	12 September 1913	–
624	Cecil Le de Spencer Wynne Roberts	12 September 1913	–
625	Francis Knox Haskins RN	13 September 1913	–
626	Colin Layzell-Apps	13 September 1913	–
627	Lt. Reginald John Bone RN	16 August 1913	–
628	Carpenter Warrant Officer Leonard Rupert Staddon	12 September 1913	–
629	Frederic George Bevis	13 September 1913	–
630	Engineer-Lt. Gerald West Storey Aldwell RN	15 September 1913	–
631	Engine Room Artificer Albert Edward Case	17 September 1913	–
632	Noel Pemberton Billing	17 September 1913	–
633	Wilfrid Watts	17 September 1913	–
634	Edward John Addis	17 September 1913	Vickers Biplane at the Vickers School, Brooklands. Lieutenant in the Royal Naval Air Service, awarded the Distinguished Flying Cross (DFC) in 1918.
635	Capt. Francis A. Ferguson RE	22 September 1913	–
636	Petty Officer Frederick James Hooper	22 September 1913	–
637	E.R.A. Vivian Rees	27 September 1913	–
638	Capt. Geoffrey Henry Cox, SR	27 September 1913	–
639	Frank Bernard Halford	2 October 1913	(1894–1955) after service with the Royal Flying Corps became an aero-engine designer and chairman and technical director of de Havilland engines. Designer of the de Havilland Gipsy piston engine.
640	E. R. A. William Badley	3 October 1913	–
641	Sir Bryan B. M. Leighton, Bt.	3 October 1913	Born 26 November 1868. Of Loton Park, Shropshire. Lieutenant Colonel Westmorland and Cumberland Yeomanry, served in First World War as Flying Officer, Royal Flying Corps; died 19 January 1919.
642	Carpenter Michael Sullivan Keogh RN	4 October 1913	–
643	Ivan Beauclerk Hart-Davies	6 October 1913	–
644	Capt. George Henderson IA	7 October 1913	–
645	Lt. Roger Montague Boger RFA	8 October 1913	–
646	Christopher Draper	9 October 1913	–
647	Lt. Ennis Tristram Ratcliffe Chambers RN	9 October 1913	–
648	Lt. Gerard Lowndes Edward Sherlock, 3rd The King's Own Hussars	9 October 1913	–
649	Lt. Charles Bennett Spence RFA	13 October 1913	–
650	Willy Voigt	15 October 1913	–
651	Lt. Eric Roper-Curzon Nanson RNR	15 October 1913	–
652	Capt. Herbert Creagh Jenings, 5th Royal Irish Lancers	16 October 1913	–
653	Capt. Thomas Couper Mudie, Royal Scots	16 October 1913	–
654	Eng.-Lt. Charles Dempster Breese RN	16 October 1913	–
655	Leonard Cameron Kidd	22 October 1913	–
656	Assistant-Paymaster Vyvian Harcourt Coles RNR	22 October 1913	Used a Vickers Biplane at the Vickers School, Brooklands. Missing in Action 21 August 1918 after the Q-ship HMS Vala was sunk by U-Boat UB-54.
657	Capt. Gerald Charles Balfour Buckland, 8th Gurkha Rifles, IA	22 October 1913	Used a Bristol Biplane at the Bristol School, Larkhill, Salisbury Plain.
658	James William Humphrys Scotland	23 October 1913	New Zealand aviator used a Caudron Biplane at the Hall School, Hendon to be the second New Zealander to gain a licence in England. In 1914 he made the first substantial cross-country flight in New Zealand.
659	Major Gerald Richard Vivian Kinsman RFA	24 October 1913	Used a Vickers Biplane at the Vickers School, Brooklands. Awarded a Distinguished Service Order and appointed a Companion of the Order of St Michael and St George (CMG) for his service during the First World War, died in 1963.
660	Reginald Kirshaw Pierson BSc	24 October 1913	An engineer, used a Vickers Biplane at the Vickers School, Brooklands. Became chief designer at Vickers, designs include the Vimy and the Wellington.
661	Maurice Bernal Blake	24 October 1913	Born in Ireland the son of Henry Arthur Blake, he is described as an equerry to Princess Marie Louise of Schleswig-Holstein. Used a Grahame-White Biplane at the Grahame-White School, Hendon. Served with the Royal Flying Corps and Royal Air Force and died in 1934.
662	Lt. Alexander Gallaher, 4th Dragoon Guards	24 October 1913	Used a Bristol Biplane at the Bristol School, Larkhill, Salisbury Plain.
663	Lt. Keith Frederick William Dunn RFA	24 October 1913	Used a Bristol Biplane at the Bristol School, Larkhill, Salisbury Plain.
664	Lt. Charles Herbert Oxlade RNR	25 October 1913	Used an EAC Biplane at the Eastbourne School, Eastbourne. Killed in action when in command of the sloop HMS Arbutus which was torpedoed by a U Boat (UB-65) in The Bristol Channel 15 December 1917.
665	Capt. Charles George Billing RM	27 October 1913	Used a Caudron Biplane at the Ewen School, Hendon. Killed in action Gallipoli 13 June 1915.
666	Lt. Charles Herbert Collet RMA	21 October 1913	Used an Avro Biplane at the Central Flying School, Upavon. Serving with the Royal Naval Air Service, on 22 September 1914 he was awarded the DSO for the first long distance air raid into enemy territory of the war, when he bombed the Zeppelin sheds at Düsseldorf. He was killed at Imbros Island, Greece on 19 August 1915.
667	Capt. Cecil Francis Kilner RMLI	22 October 1913	Used a B.E. Biplane at the Central Flying School, Upavon. Took part in the Cuxhaven Raid on Zeppelin sheds on Christmas Day, 1914. Died 20 October 1925 as a Royal Air Force Group Captain.
668	Ordinary Telegraphist Robert Millar Stirling RN	22 October 1913	Used a Bristol Biplane at the Naval School, Eastchurch.
669	Warrant Officer Artificer Engineer William Foster Floyd RN	24 October 1913	Used a Bristol Biplane at the Naval School, Eastchurch. Killed in a flying accident in Essex, 21 January 1918.
670	2nd Lt. Ralph William Gore Hinds, Royal Inniskilling Fusiliers	31 October 1913	Used a Bristol Biplane at the Bristol School, Brooklands. Killed in action in France 16 May 1915.
671	Lt. William Foster MacNeece, 1st Battalion, Queen's Own Regt.	31 October 1913	Used a Bristol Biplane at the Bristol School, Brooklands. Served on the western front in the First World War as a pilot during 1914, he returned to England and specialised on balloons, he was seconded to the Royal Naval Air Service to train them in the operation of kite balloons. He was awarded the Distinguished Flying Cross in 1916 after his balloon was shot-down and he escaped by parachute, being badly injured. He retired from the Royal Air Force in 1937 as an Air Commodore and was recalled during the Second World War as an Air Vice-Marshal.
672	Petty Officer James Fraser Grady RN	1 November 1913	Used a Maurice Farman Biplane at the Central Flying School, Upavon.
673	1st Air Mechanic William Hedley Butt RFC	1 November 1913	Used a Maurice Farman Biplane at the Central Flying School, Upavon.
674	1st Air Mechanic Ernest Edward Copper RFC	1 November 1913.	Used a Maurice Farman Biplane at the Central Flying School, Upavon.
675	Engine Room Artificer Hugh Nelson RN	1 November 1913	Used a Bristol Biplane at the Naval School, Eastchurch.
676	Lt. de Courcy Wyndor Plunkett Ireland RN	1 November 1913	Used a Bristol Biplane at the Naval School, Eastchurch. Was with the Royal Naval Air Service when he was killed 21 Feb 1916 near Rochester, Kent.
677	Sgt. David Patterson RFC	4 November 1913	Used a Short Biplane at the Central Flying School, Upavon.
678	2nd Lt. George John Malcolm RA	5 November 1913	Used a Vickers Biplane at the Vickers School, Brooklands. Killed in action in France 9 Jul 1916 flying with 20 Squadron RFC.
679	Capt. Thomas Hugh Colville Frankland, Royal Dublin Fusiliers	5 November 1913	Used a Vickers Biplane at the Vickers School, Brooklands. Killed in action at Gallipoli 25 April 1915.
680	2nd Lt. Sydney Harry Batty-Smith, 1st Loyal North Lancashire Regt.	5 November 1913	Used a Vickers Biplane at the Vickers School, Brooklands. He was the Aide-de-camp to the Governor of Hong Kong when he was killed 12 February 1945 and buried at Stanley Military Cemetery.
681	Sub-Lt. John Douglas Harvey RN	6 November 1913	Used a Bristol Biplane at the Bristol School, Brooklands.
682	2nd Lt. Marcus Winslow Huish RFA	8 November 1913	Used a Bristol Biplane at the Bristol School, Larkhill, Salisbury Plain.
683	Acting-Lt. Rupert Healey Walley RNR	21 October 1913	Used a Maurice Farman Biplane at the Central Flying School, Upavon.
684	Chief-Armourer Charles Hart Whitlock RN	1 November 1913	Used a Bristol Biplane at the Naval School, Eastchurch.
685	Sgt. Fred Farrer RFC	7 November 1913	Used a Maurice Farman Biplane at the Central Flying School, Upavon.
686	Lt. The Hon. Herbert Lyttelton Pelham, 2nd Bn., Royal Sussex Regiment.	11 November 1913	Used a Vickers Biplane at the Vickers School, Brooklands. Killed in action France 14 September 1914.
687	Lt. Hugh Frederic Treeby, West Riding Regt.	16 November 1913	Used a Bristol Biplane at the Bristol School, Brooklands. Died 19 March 1914 at Salisbury Plain.
688	2nd Lt. William Ralph Elliot Harrison RFA	21 November 1913	Used a Bristol Biplane at the Bristol School, Larkhill, Salisbury Plain. Also holds certificate #11184 awarded 21 June 1933 when he was a Lt Col at the War Office. Harrison died from drowning when his yacht sank on 22 September 1934.
689	Henry Spencer Newton Courtney	22 November 1913	Used a Bristol Biplane at the Bristol School, Larkhill, Salisbury Plain.
690	Lt. Robert John Ferguson Barton, Royal Scots Fusiliers	24 November 1913	Used a Vickers Biplane at the Vickers School, Brooklands.
691	Sgt. James McCrae, RFC(MW)	24 November 1913	Used a Short Biplane at the Central Flying School, Upavon.
692	Shipwright Henry Herbert Scott RN	24 November 1913	Used a Farman Biplane at the Central Flying School, Upavon.
693	Capt. Daniel Harrison Macdonell DSO	25 November 1913	A captain in the Northern Nigeria Regiment used a Vickers Biplane at the Vickers School, Brooklands. Won the DSO in the South African War in the early 1900s and became a pilot in the Royal Flying Corps.
694	Lt. Augustus Charles Earle Marsh	26 November 1913	Used a Bristol Biplane at the Bristol School, Salisbury Plain. Claimed the first confirmed RFC victory in the First World War when with 6 Squadron he shot down a "Fokker" on 1 November 1914.
695	Lt. Cedric Yeats McDonald, Seaforth Highlanders	27 November 1913	Used a Bristol Biplane at the Bristol School, Brooklands.
696	2nd Lt. Gerald Henry Broadhurst RFA	29 November 1913	Used a Bristol Biplane at the Bristol School, Brooklands. Missing in action in Flanders 8 May 1915.
697	Owen Bulmer Howell	29 November 1913	Described as a Solicitor, used a Vickers Biplane at the Vickers School, Brooklands. Served in the Royal Naval Air Service.
698	John Marten Rush Cripps	2 December 1913	Used a Grahame-White Biplane at the Grahame-White School, Hendon. Served in the Royal Naval Air Service.
699	Rolf Gustav Ugo von Segebaden	7 December 1913	Swedish aviator used a Grahame-White Biplane at the Grahame-White School, Hendon.
700	Capt. Maurice George Lee, 40th Pathans, IA	8. December 1913	New Zealand-born aviator used a Vickers Biplane at the Vickers School, Brooklands.
701	Sgt. Duncan Mitchell RFC	11. December 1913	Used a Maurice Farman Biplane at the Central Flying School, Upavon.
702	Capt. Basil Henri Louis Hay	11. December 1913	Used a Bristol Biplane at the Bristol School at Salisbury Plain and Brooklands.
703	Harold Richard Johnson	11. December 1913	Described as a motor engineer used a Caudron Biplane at the Ewen School, Hendon. Killed in action in France 19 January 1916 in a flying accident with 3 Squadron RFC.
704	Norman Howarth	11. December 1913	Described as an engineer used a Grahame-White Biplane at the Grahame-White School, Hendon.
705	Second Lt. Thomas Leonard Stanley Holbrow RE	13. December 1913	Used a Caudron Biplane at the Ewen School, Hendon. Killed in action in France 28 March 1918.
706	William Henry Elliott	22 November 1913	Used an Avro Biplane at the Shoreham Flying School, Shoreham.
707	Sgt. John Roland Gardiner RFC	11 Dec 1913	Used a Short Biplane at the Central Flying School, Upavon.
708	Ian Cameron Macdonell	17 December 1913	Canadian aviator and described as an engineer used a Bristol Biplane at the Bristol School, Brooklands. Killed in action in France 2 July 1916.
709	Sir Robert George Vivian Duff	18 December 1913	Listed by the RAeC as Robin George Duff, used a Vickers Biplane at the Vickers School, Brooklands. Killed in action in Belgium 16 October 1914.
710	James Leonard Finney	19 December 1913	Used a Bristol Biplane at the Bristol School, Brooklands.
711	Capt. Hugh Caswall Tremenheere Dowding RA	20 December 1913	Used a Vickers Biplane at the Vickers School, Brooklands. Flew with the Royal Flying Corps and later Royal Air Force, He was the commander of RAF Fighter Command during the Battle of Britain. Retired as an Air Vice Marshal in 1942 and became Baron Dowding of Bentley Priory. Died in 1970 aged 87.
712	Sgt. Frederick George Bateman RFC	20 December 1913	Used a Maurice Farman Biplane at the Royal Flying Corps, Netheravon.
713	Lt. Charles Edward Ridgway Bridson, 3rd Battalion, King's Own Regiment	20 December 1913	Used a Bristol Biplane at the Bristol School, Brooklands. Died in Belgium 4 April 1916 aged 25.
714	Sub-Lt. Geoffrey Rhodes Bromet RN	22 December 1913	Used a Bristol Biplane at the Bristol School at Salisbury Plain and Brooklands. Retired in 1945 as a Royal Air Force Air Vice-Marshal and became the Lieutenant Governor of the Isle of Man until 1952, he died in 1983.
715	Lt. Rowland Edward Brian Hunt	22 December 1913	Used an EAC Biplane at the Eastbourne Aviation School. Eastbourne.
716	Lt. Edmund Digby Maxwell Robertson RN	22 December 1913	Used a Bristol Biplane at the Bristol School at Brooklands. Later flew with the Royal Air Force and retired in 1935 as an Air Commodore, was awarded the Distinguished Flying Cross in 1919.
717	Andrew Delfosse Badgery	22 December 1913	Australian-born aviator used a Caudron Biplane at the Ewen School, Hendon. Flew with the Australian Flying Corps from 1916 to 1918. Was married to Dorothy Wall an author and illustrator of children's fiction books.
718	Lt. Robert Crosby Halahan RN	24 December 1913	Used a Bristol Biplane at the Bristol School, Salisbury Plain. Killed in action June 1916 in North Sea with the loss of Submarine E18.
719	Cecil Francis Webb	31 December 1913	Described as an engineer and draughtsman he used a Grahame-White Biplane at the Grahame-White School at Hendon.

== See also ==
Lists for other years:

- 1910
- 1911
- 1912
- 1913
- 1914
- List of pilots with foreign Aviator's Certificates accredited by the Royal Aero Club 1910-1914
