= Arthur Edward George =

- Born: 17 June 1875; Fordington, Dorset, England
- Died: 8 September 1951 (aged 76); Bingley, Yorkshire, England

Arthur Edward George (17 June 1875 – 8 September 1951) was an accomplished sportsman, an aviation pioneer, aircraft designer, racing driver, engineer and businessman. He served in the Second Boer War (in the British Cape Colony armed forces), in World War I and in World War II, and was awarded the Silver medal of the Royal Aero Club posthumously for his "Services to aviation over 50 years".

== Early life ==
Arthur Edward George was born in Fordington, near Dorchester, Dorset, England on 17 June 1875; his family moved to Newcastle upon Tyne while he was a child. He was a talented athlete, being a swimmer, figure skater and racing cyclist at international level.

After serving an engineering apprenticeship in Newcastle, he lived for some time in South Africa, where he became national cycling champion and represented South Africa at the 1899 UCI Track Cycling World Championships in Montreal, Canada. He served with the Cape Colony Cyclist Corps from 7 January 1901 until 12 May 1902 in the Second Boer War, receiving the Queen's South Africa Medal with three clasps. On his attestation (joining-up) form he is described as being "Age: 23(?), Nationality: English, Trade: Cycle Mechanic, Height: 5 ft 10½in, Weight: 150 lbs, Chest: 38in, Complexion: Fair, Eyes: Blue, Hair: Black, Character: Very good." It was noted that he "Supplies own bicycle".

== Later life ==
In 1902, having returned to England, he formed the company George and Jobling in Newcastle upon Tyne with Robert ("Bob") Lee Jobling. In 1904 the company moved to premises which had previously been used by Robert Stephenson and Company, which it was to occupy for 60 years. George and Jobling first manufactured bicycles and later motor vehicles and automobile bodywork. It also sold motor vehicles and was an agent for many manufacturers. In addition to its coachbuilding business, George & Jobling| sold motor vehicles and was an agent for many manufacturers, including Argyll, Darracq, Hillman, Ford and Fordson. Between 1907 and 1970, the firm had branches in Hexham, Glasgow, Darlington, Bowness and Leeds and is credited with inventing the forerunner of the trolley-jack and the breakdown-truck. It became well known as 'expert witnesses' in court cases involving serious motoring accidents.

George was a keen racing driver and competed at home and in mainland Europe in road races, hill climbs and sand racing. He achieved third place driving a Darracq in the 1908 RAC Tourist Trophy race (Note: Two other pioneer aviators, John Moore-Brabazon and Alfred "Toby" Rawlinson, also took part in the 1908 IOM TT, the former finishing in 7th place in his Darracq, the latter having to retire after the 6th lap due to a faulty exhaust valve on his Metallurgique.), during which he also set the fastest lap time, and won many races in a stripped-down Ford Model T at Brooklands and Saltburn. This same car was later fitted with a polished brass body and became known as the 'Golden Ford', which is still preserved. (Note: A photograph of the "Golden Ford" can be seen here.) During the National Strike of 1926, he was involved in driving newspapers from Newcastle to London."

In August 1909 George became an active member of the Royal Aero Club of the United Kingdom and learned to fly on a Voisin biplane called Bird of Passage which he had bought from J.T.C. Moore-Brabazon, holder of Aviator's Certificate no. 1; he later sold the Bird of Passage to Cecil Grace. He designed and built his own aeroplane, which featured hollow spars, a steerable tail-wheel and unique 'triplicate control column which controlled not only roll and pitch but also yaw. The control column has been preserved and is on display at the Discovery Museum in Newcastle upon Tyne. On 6 September 1910 he gained Aviator's Certificate no. 19 flying this prototype aircraft. Front and side elevation views of his aircraft, which was displayed at the Olympia Exhibition in 1910, can be found in the Flight Magazine archive. Later the same year he crashed it at an Air display in Newcastle; his application to the banks for more funds to continue designing and building aircraft was refused on the grounds that it was too dangerous; after this setback, he concentrated his efforts on customising and selling cars.

He nevertheless took an active interest in flying throughout his life: he was a leading member of the Newcastle upon Tyne Aero Club; he obtained his Civil Aviation Class A Pilot's Licence in 1935 and his Class A glider pilot's licence in 1937; in World War II he served from July 1939 until November 1940 as Commanding Officer of 131 Tyneside Squadron, Air Defence Cadet Corps.

A.E.George volunteered for military service in World War I, rising to the rank of (temporary) Major in the Northumberland Motor Volunteer Corps. Between the wars he pursued his business, sporting and flying interests, serving again in World War II as Commanding Officer of the local Air Defence Cadet Corps between 1939 and 1940, followed by volunteer service in both the Home Guard and the Royal Navy.

On 8 September 1951 George died of cancer in Bingley, Yorkshire, aged 76. His funeral was held in Newcastle and was attended by local dignitaries, representatives of the aviation world and previous employees. The local RAF Air Cadets performed a fly-past over the funeral ceremony. In honour of his services to aviation, the Royal Aero Club awarded him a posthumous Silver Medal.
