= List of pilots awarded an Aviator's Certificate by the Royal Aero Club in 1912 =

The Royal Aero Club issued Aviators Certificates from 1910. These were internationally recognised under the Fédération Aéronautique Internationale.

== List ==
Aviator's Certificates awarded
in 1910 (1–38)	in 1911 (39–168)	in 1912 (169–382)	in 1913 (383–719)	in 1914 (720–1032)

Legend

Individual was killed in an aviation accident.
Individual was killed flying in military action.

Royal Aero Club certificates awarded in 1912 (nos. 169–382)
No.	Name	Date	Comment
169	Lt. Garthshore Tindal Porter RA	9 January 1912	(1887–1957) Australian-born. Used a Bristol Biplane at Salisbury Plain. Born in Queensland Colony before joining the British Army. Served in the Royal Garrison Artillery, the Royal Flying Corps and Royal Air Force. Died in Cheltenham.
170	Lt. Amyas Eden Borton, Black Watch	9 January 1912	(1886–1969) Used a Bristol Biplane at Salisbury Plain. Served in the Royal Flying Corps and the Royal Air Force. Retired as an air vice-marshal, in 1933.
171	Benjamin Graham Wood	9 January 1912	(1883–1967) An engineer. Used a Hewlett and Blondeau Farman biplane at Brooklands.
172	Sydney Vincent Sippe	9 January 1912	Used an Avro biplane at Brooklands. Flew with the Royal Flying Corps and the Royal Naval Air Service. On 21 November 1914 he attacked the Zeppelin sheds at Lake Constance. Sippe was awarded the Distinguished Service Order in 1915, he died in 1968.
173	Tom Garne	16 January 1912	Used a Bristol biplane at Brooklands.
174	Lt. Napier John Gill	16 January 1912	Author of "The Flyer's Guide: An Elementary Handbook for Aviators", 1917.
175	Frederick Bernard Fowler	16 January 1912	Founded the Eastbourne Aviation Company; in 1919, at the rank of major, he was awarded the AFC (UK). He was also a member of the 1921 Sempill Mission to Japan, for which he was awarded the Order of the Rising Sun (4th Class)
176	Lt. Alan Geoffrey Fox RE	30 January 1912	–
177	Lt. Eric Mackay Murray	30 January 1912	1886–1954Served in the Royal Flying Corps and was awarded the Military Cross and the Distinguished Service Order, retired in 1933 as a Group Captain in the Royal Air Force.
178	Giovanni Sabelli	30 January 1912	(1886–1917) Italian. Used a Deperdussin Monoplane at Brooklands. Killed in action over the Bainsizza Plateau.
179	Frederick Warren Merriam	6 February 1912	–
180	William Bendall	6 February 1912	–
181	Eng. Lt. Charles Russell Jekyl Randall	13 February 1912	–
182	Capt. Thomas Weeding	13 February 1912	–
183	Damer Leslie Allen	20 February 1912	Disappeared while attempting to cross the Irish Channel from Holyhead on 18 April 1912.
184	Sydney Parr	20 February 1912	–
185	Lt. Bertram Richard White Beor RFA	20 February 1912	–
186	Marcel Desoutter	27 February 1912	–
187	Lt. Stephen Christopher Winfield-Smith	27 February 1912	–
188	Lt. Cecil Thomas Carfrae RFA	27 February 1912	–
189	Herbert Dennis Cutler	5 March 1912	–
190	Victor Annesley Barrington-Kennett	5 March 1912	(1887–1916). 2nd Lt in the London Balloon Corps used a Short biplane at Eastchurch. Killed in action flying a Bristol Scout on 13 Mar 1916 in Flanders while serving as a Major and commanding officer of No. 4 Squadron Royal Flying Corps. Three of the four brothers were killed in the Great War (see entry: No. 43).
191	Lt. Clement Gordon Wakefield Head RN	5 March 1912	-Lt. Cmdr of HM Submarine D2 which was rammed and sunk by German Patrol boat in the North Sea off Borkum Island on 25 November 1914. Memorial on Portsmouth Naval Memorial for Officers killed in 1914 and in Seaford Cemetery.
192	Lt. Charles Longcroft	5 March 1912	RFC pilot, squadron, wing and brigade commander during World War I. First Commandant of the RAF College Cranwell.
193	Cyril Wright Meredith	5 March 1912	–
194	Capt. Patrick Hamilton	12 March 1912	Died in a crash in Deperdussin Monoplane 100 Gnome No. 258 at Graveley, near Welwyn, on 6 September 1912. Passenger Lieut. A. Wyness-Stuart (Aviator's Certificate no. 141) was also killed. The accident was considered to have been caused by "a part of the engine coming off and hitting the bonnet over the engine, smashing one of the wing wires, and thus loosening the wings".
195	Cecil J. L'Estrange Malone	12 March 1912	Pioneer naval aviator and Britain's first communist member of the House of Commons
196	Major George Hebden Raleigh, Essex Regiment	12 March 1912	(1878–1915) Australian. Used a Bristol Monoplane at Brooklands, killed in action 21 January 1915 off Belgian Coast, flying a Vickers FB5. Born in Melbourne and educated at Geelong Grammar School, before joining the British Army and serving in the 2nd Boer War: Queen's South Africa Medal and 8 clasps.
197	Ronald Louis Charteris	12 March 1912	Used a Deperdussin Monoplane at Brooklands, an aeronautical engineer with the All British Engine Company.
198	George Prensiell	19 March 1912	A German engineer, used a Bleriot Monoplane at Hendon.
199	William Ewart Hart	26 March 1912	(1885–1943) An Australian aviator who was the first to qualify in Australia, holding an Australian aviator's licence no.1, dated 5 December 1911.
200	Capt. Francis John Brodigan	26 March 1912	1st Gloucester Regiment (infantry), who was killed in action on 9 May 1915 at Aubers Ridge.
201	Lt. Alexander Ernest Burchardt-Ashton, 4th Dragoon Guards	16 April 1912	Used a Bristol Biplane at Larkhill, Salisbury Plain. He hit and killed a 15-year-old boy at Larkhill in May 1912 when he landed too fast and ran into the crowd. Because of a lack of brakes at the time it was deemed an accidental death. He resigned his commission in 1915, and was killed in action in France on 11 July 1916 as a Lance Corporal with the Royal Fusiliers.
202	Lt. F. A. P. Williams-Freeman RN	16 April 1912	–
203	Com. O. Schwann RN	16 April 1912	–
204	Capt. P. W. L. Broke-Smith RE	16 April 1912	Awarded Airship Pilot's Certificate No. 2 on 14 February 1911
205	Lt. L. C. Rogers Harrison	16 April 1912	Killed in air crash in a Cody V biplane on 28 April 1913 at Farnborough
206	Sub.-Lt. C. H. K. Edmonds RN	16 April 1912	Awarded the DSO for his role in the Cuxhaven Raid in 1914; in 1917 made the first successful aerial torpedo attack i.e. from a Short Seaplane against a Turkish ship. He was an Air Vice Marshal during World War II.
207	D. G. Young	16 April 1912	–
208	Lucien Alfred Tremlett	30 April 1912	Born in Paris in 1887 he took his certificate on a Bleriot Monoplane at Hendon.
209	Lt. John Dolben Mackworth	30 April 1912	Born in Wales in 1887 he took his certificate on a Bristol Biplane at Brooklands. Later a lieutenant-colonel in the Royal Flying Corps involved with the development of ballons and kite balloons, he died in 1939.
210	Lt. Esme Fairfax Chinnery	30 April 1912	1886–1915 Coldstream Guards and Royal Flying Corps, killed in an aircraft accident in France on 18 January 1915
211	John Robertson Duigan	30 April 1912	–
212	Lt. H. C. Fielding	30 April 1912	–
213	Major Sir Alexander Bannerman, Bart., RE	30 April 1912	–
214	Lt. Alan Hartree RFA	14 May 1912	–
215	Lt. Gordon Strachey Shephard	14 May 1912	Rose quickly to the rank of Brigadier-General at age 32; Commanding Officer of 1st Brigade R.F.C, died 19 January 1918, when his Nieuport Scout span into the ground.
216	Lt. Donald Swain Lewis RE	14 May 1912	Died on an inspection flight in France in 1916.
217	Capt. Godfrey Paine RN	14 May 1912	First commandant of the Central Flying School at RAF Upavon; he attained the ranks of Major-General, Rear-Admiral and Air Vice-Marshal, possibly the only person to have held flag, general and air officer ranks in the British armed services; he was also Inspector-General of the RAF and 5th Sea Lord/Director of Naval Aviation
218	Henry Charles Baird	4 June 1912	–
219	Hugh Percy Nesham	4 June 1912	–
220	Charles Lindsay-Campbell	4 June 1912	Killed at Brooklands in a Bristol monoplane on 3 August 1912 when the aircraft stalled after engine failure.
221	Francis Henry Fowler	4 June 1912	–
222	Thomas O'Brien Hubbard	4 June 1912	1882–1962 Served with the Royal Flying Corps and Royal Air Force 1914–1921, awarded the Military Cross and Air Force Cross, retired as a Royal Air Force Group Captain.
223	Montague Righton Nevill Jennings	4 June 1912	1890–1976 Served with the Royal Flying Corps and was awarded the Military Cross and Air Force Cross in 1918, later served with the Royal Air Force Volunteer Reserve during the Second World War.
224	Alphonse Potet	4 June 1912	A French mechanic used a Bleriot Monoplane at Hendon.
225	Richard Thomas Gates	4 June 1912	Former Yeomanry officer he used a Howard-Wright Biplane at Hendon. Became general manager of the Grahame-White factory at Hendon, he was given a special duty commission in the Royal Naval Air Service at the start of the first world war. Died of injuries on 14 September 1914 a few days after his Henry Farman biplane crashed at Hendon returning from an anti-Zeppelin patrol.
226	Lt. David Percival RGA	4 June 1912	–
227	2nd.-Corporal Frank Ridd RE	4 June 1912	1884–? Using a Bristol Biplane at Salisbury Plain he becomes the first non-commissioned officer to become a pilot. A former Bricklayer before he joined the Royal Engineers, he had transferred to the Royal Flying Corps in May 1912 and moved to the Royal Air Force on 1 April 1918 where he was a Carpenter and Rigger.
228	Lt. Leonard Dawes	4 June 1912	1885–? 2nd Middlesex Regiment, served with the Royal Flying Corps and Royal Air Force during the Great War before returning to the Army. Appointed a Chevalier of the Legion of Honour by the French in November 1914.
229	Lt. J. N. Fletcher RE	4 June 1912	–
230	Lt. Baron Trevenen James RE	4 June 1912	1889–1915 Killed in action 13 July 1915 with 6 Squadron RFC.
231	Marcus Dyce Manton	4 June 1912	–
232	Staff-Sergeant Richard H. V. Wilson RE	18 June 1912	Died in a crash on Salisbury Plain 5 July 1912, in a Nieuport piloted by Eustace B. Loraine.
233	Lt. Desmond L. Arthur	18 June 1912	Died on the morning of 27 May 1913 at Montrose when the upper starboard wing of his aircraft, a B.E. Biplane (No 205), broke, causing both starboard planes to collapse progressively. The Accident Investigation Committee decided that the primary cause of the accident was the failure of a faulty joint in a repair to the rear main spar. The Committee expressed the opinion "that the repair referred to was (...) so badly done that it could not possibly be regarded as the work of a conscientious and competent workman."
234	Lt. Ercole Ercole	18 June 1912	Italian Army aviator used a Bristol biplane at Larkhill, Salisbury Plain.
235	Paul Dubois	18 June 1912	–
236	Capt. John Harold Whitworth Becke	18 June 1912	Royal Flying Corps aviator used a Bristol Biplane at Brooklands. Retired from the Royal Air Force as a brigadier-general in 1920.
237	Norman S. Roupell	18 June 1912	–
238	Edward H. Morriss	18 June 1912	–
239	Capt. A. D. Carden	18 June 1912	–
240	Capt. Herbert Charles Agnew RE	2 July 1912	–
241	Lionel Boyd Moss	2 July 1912	–
242	Capt. T. Ince Webb-Bowen	2 July 1912	–
243	Vivian Hugh Nicholas Wadham	16 July 1912	–
244	P. L. W. Herbert	16 July 1912	–
245	A. Christie	16 July 1912	–
246	H. I. Bulkely	16 July 1912	–
247	E. V. Anderson	16 July 1912	–
248	Ronald Hargrave Kershaw	16 July 1912	Royal Naval Air Service aviator used a Howard Wright biplane at Hendon, later a Group Captain in the Royal Air Force, died in 1969.
249	K. R. Shaw	16 July 1912	–
250	R. A. Lister	16 July 1912	–
251	Harold Sweetman-Powell	24 July 1912	–
252	Lt. Hugh Lambert Reilly IA	24 July 1912	–
253	Air Mechanic William Victor Strugnell	24 July 1912	1892–1977 Royal Flying Corps, a First World War flying ace he was credited with six aerial victories, retired as a Royal Air Force Group Captain in 1945. He was awarded a Military Cross in 1914 and a bar in 1917.
254	Lt. F. M. Worthington-Wilmer	24 July 1912	–
255	Capt. Robert C. W. Alston	24 July 1912	–
256	Lt. Claude Albemarle Bettington	24 July 1912	Killed on 10 September 1912, as a passenger of Edward Hotchkiss, when their Bristol Monoplane crashed due to the failure of a quick release cable fitment, which caused the fabric of the starboard wing to fail.
257	Capt. Charles Darbyshire	24 July 1912	–
258	Robert William Rickerby Gill	24 July 1912	–
259	Edward Petre	24 July 1912	Brother of Henry A. Petre, holder of Aviator's Certificate no. 128; killed 24 December 1912 at Marske-by-the-Sea, Yorkshire
260	Lt. Francis FitzGerald Waldron	24 July 1912	–
261	Herbert Rutter Simms	24 July 1912	Used an Avro Biplane at The Roe School, Brooklands. Killed in action as a Flight Sub-Lieutenant, Royal Naval Air Service off the Belgian Coast 5 May 1916.
262	Pte. John Edmonds RMLI	30 July 1912	–
263	Sidney Pickles	30 July 1912	–
264	Maj. John Frederick Andrews Higgins RFA	30 July 1912	–
265	Eng. Lt. Edward Featherstone Briggs RN	30 July 1912	Led the bombing raid on the Zeppelin Base at Friedrichshafen on 21 November 1914. Shot down and wounded by anti-aircraft fire and became a POW. Served in the RAF after the war and retired with the rank of Group Captain. Died in 1962.
266	Capt. Charles Percy Nicholas IA	30 July 1912	–
267	Lt. Kenlis Parcival Atkinson RFA	30 July 1912	–
268	Ralph Gerald Holyoake	13 August 1912	–
269	Air Mechanic William Thomas James McCudden	13 August 1912	Used a Bristol Biplane at the Army School, Salisbury Plain. He was the elder brother of James McCudden VC. Died when his Bleriot had engine trouble on 1 May 1915 at Fort Grange.
270	Maj. Hugh Montague Trenchard	13 August 1912	Later to command the Royal Flying Corps in France and serve as first Chief of the Air Staff
271	Lt. Reginald Cholmondeley	13 August 1912	–
272	Capt. John Maitland Salmond	13 August 1912	A Captain in the King's Own Royal Lancaster Regiment he used a Grahame-White Biplane at the Grahame-White School at Hendon. Marshal of the Royal Air Force Sir John Maitland Salmond retired from the Royal Air Force in 1943 and he died in 1968.
273	Capt. Alister Maxwell MacDonell	13 August 1912	–
274	William Snowdon Hedley	13 August 1912	–
275	William John Harrison	13 August 1912	–
276	Staff-Sergeant William Thomas	3 September 1912	–
277	Capt. Robert Harry Lucas Cordner RAMC	3 September 1912	–
278	Richard Harold Barnwell	3 September 1912	Brother of Frank Barnwell. Became a test pilot for Vickers, killed testing the Vickers F.B.26
279	Capt. The Hon. Claude Brabazon	3 September 1912	–
280	Lt. Philip Joubert de la Ferté RFA	3 September 1912	Retired in 1945 as Air Chief Marshal RAF
281	Maj. Edward Bailey Ashmore MVO, RFA	3 September 1912	–
282	Lt. Claude Grenville Shephard Gould RGA	3 September 1912	–
283	Lt. Patrick Henry Lyon Playfair RFA	3 September 1912	–
284	Lt. F. A. Wanklyn RFA	3 September 1912	–
285	Walter Laurence Brock	3 September 1912	–
286	Engine-room Artificer Thomas O'Connor RN	3 September 1912	–
287	Edouard Baumann	3 September 1912	–
288	Lt. Philip Shepherd RN	17 September 1912	–
289	I. G. Vaughan-Fowler	17 September 1912	–
290	Lt. Gilbert Vernon Wildman-Lushington RMA	17 September 1912	Died when the Maurice-Farman aircraft he was flying at Eastchurch side-slipped and crashed on Tuesday, 2 December 1913. His passenger, Capt. Fawcett, RM, survived, suffering a broken collarbone. On the previous Saturday, Wildman-Lushington had taken the then First Lord of the Admiralty, Winston Churchill, for a series of three flying lessons in a Short Brothers S.38 biplane, during the third of which Churchill took the controls for a time, making him the first serving Cabinet minister to have flown an aeroplane.
291	John Laurence Hall	17 September 1912	–
292	Samuel Summerfield	17 September 1912	–
293	2nd Lt Edward Wallace Cheeseman RFC	17 September 1912	A 2nd Lt in the Royal Flying Corps he used a Beatty-Wright biplane at the Beatty School, Cricklewood. Died following a flying accident in South Africa 15 October 1913
294	Assistant Paymaster George Stanley Trewin RN	17 September 1912	–
295	Ernest Frank Sutton	17 September 1912	–
296	Lt. John Wilfred Seddon RN	17 September 1912	–
297	Harry George Hawker	17 September 1912	–
298	Lt. A C Holms MacLean	17 September 1912	–
299	Capt. Charles L. Price	17 September 1912	–
300	Lt. G. B. Stopford RFA	17 September 1912	–
301	Geoffrey W. England	17 September 1912	Died on 5 March 1913 when the Bristol Monoplane he was testing suffered a structural failure of the port wing, causing the aircraft to dive into the ground.
302	Vivian Hewitt	1 October 1912	–
303	Capt. Charles Erskine Risk RMLI	1 October 1912	–
304	Lt. Ivon Terence Courtney RMLI	1 October 1912	–
305	Capt. Edward Ellington	1 October 1912	Later Marshal of the Royal Air Force
306	Victor Yates	1 October 1912	–
307	Lt. Hugh Fanshawe Glanville, West India Regiment	1 October 1912	–
308	Lt. Leslie Da Costa Penn-Gaskell, 3rd Norfolk Regiment	1 October 1912	–
309	Capt. Herbert Creagh MacDonnell, The Royal Irish Regiment	1 October 1912	–
310	Arthur Edward Geere	1 October 1912	–
311	2nd Lt. Dermot Roberts Hanlon RGA	1 October 1912	–
312	Lt. Felton Vesey Holt	1 October 1912	–
313	Capt. George Ralph Miller RFA	1 October 1912	–
314	A. M. Wynne	15 October 1912	–
315	John Herbert James	15 October 1912	–
316	Lt. G. I. Carmichael RFA	15 October 1912	–
317	Victor Colin Higginbottom	15 October 1912	–
318	2nd Lt. D. L. Allen, 87th Royal Irish Fusiliers	15 October 1912	–
319	Lt. L. Loultcheff, Bulgarian Army	15 October 1912	–
320	Lt. R. G. H. Murray, 9th Gurkha Rifles	15 October 1912	–
321	Dr. David Edmund Stodart	15 October 1912	–
322	Edward Birch	15 October 1912	–
323	W. L. Hardman	15 October 1912	–
324	Rudolph Holscher	15 October 1912	–
325	E. N. Fuller	15 October 1912	–
326	A. V. Bettington	15 October 1912	–
327	Captain R. S. H. Grace, 13th Hussars	15 October 1912	–
328	Lt. C. L. Courtney RN	15 October 1912	–
329	C. W. Wilson	15 October 1912	–
330	Paymaster Eustace R. Berne RN	15 October 1912	E.R. Berne died on 21 April 1913 on the ground at Eastchurch, when an aircraft with Gilbert V. Wildman-Lushington (see #290 above) at the controls suddenly ran forward, knocking him down and catching his legs with the propeller. Berne died from loss of blood and shock two and a half hours after the accident.
331	Howard T. Wright	15 October 1912	–
332	Harold Wesley Hall	15 October 1912	–
333	Albert Deakin RN	15 October 1912	–
334	Boatswain Henry C. Bobbett RN	19 October 1912	–
335	Capt. Robert Boger RE	22 October 1912	
336	Lt. A. M. Read, Northamptonshire Regiment	22 October 1912	Later won the Victoria Cross. Killed in action September 1915.
337	Arthur Payze	22 October 1912	
338	Lt. Frederick Ernest Styles, Royal Munster Fusiliers	22 October 1912	
339	Norman Channing Spratt	22 October 1912	
340	Capt. J. A. Chamier, 33rd Punjabis	22 October 1912	
341	2nd Lt. G. F. Pretyman, 1st Somerset Light Infantry	22 October 1912	
342	Lt. E. L. Conran 2nd County of London Yeomanry	22 October 1912	
343	Lt. F. G. Small Connaught Rangers	22 October 1912	
344	Henry Howard James	22 October 1912	
345	Commander Alan Montagu Yeats Brown RN	22 October 1912	
346	Capt. J. H. Gibbon RFA	29 October 1912	
347	Lt. G. A. Parker, 3rd Battalion Gloucestershire Regiment	29 October 1912	
348	Capt. James Lancaster Lucena RFRA	29 October 1912	
349	Cyril Edgar Foggin	29 October 1912	
350	Emile Louis Gassier	29 October 1912	
351	Capt. Frederick St. George Tucker, The Worcestershire Regiment	29 October 1912	
352	Capt. Robert Pigot, Rifle Brigade	29 October 1912	
353	Tom Grave	29 October 1912	
354	Capt. John Crosby Halahan, late Royal Dublin Fusiliers	29 October 1912	
355	Denys Charles Ware	29 October 1912	
356	Capt. Oliver de Lancey Williams, 2nd Royal Welch Fusiliers	12 November 1912	
357	Capt. Herbert Musgrave RE	12 November 1912	
358	Lt. Hon. John David Boyle, Rifle Brigade	12 November 1912	
359	Frank William Lerwill	12 November 1912	
360	Lt. John F. A. Trotter RFRA	12 November 1912	
361	Leading Seaman Herbert Rusell RN	12 November 1912	
362	Lt. Reginald M. Rodwell, 1st West Yorkshire Regiment	12 November 1912	
363	Capt. Frederick George Kunhardt, 74th Punjabis	12 November 1912	
364	Maj. Arthur Baron Forman RFA	12 November 1912	1873–1951 Retired as a brigadier-general
365	Lt. Richard B. Kitson, 58th Rifles FF, IA	12 November 1912	
366	Lt. Colin George MacArthur RN	26 November 1912	
367	Prince Serge Cantacuzène	26 November 1912	
368	John Alcock	26 November 1912	1892–1919 With Arthur Whitten Brown, first to fly across the Atlantic non-stop. Killed in a flying accident in France in 1919.
369	Lt. Arthur Henry Leslie Soames, 3rd The King's Own Hussars	26 November 1912	–
370	Midshipman Noel F. Wheeler RN	17 December 1912	–
371	Pierre Gratien	17 December 1912	French
372	Petty Officer Joseph Claude Andrews RN	17 December 1912	–
373	Capt. John Nowell Stanhope Sunt, 5th Dragoon Guards	17 December 1912	–
374	Shipwright Robert W. Edwards RN	17 December 1912	–
375	2nd Lt. William Claud Kennedy. Birch, Yorkshire Regiment	17 December 1912	1891–1918 Served in the Royal Flying Corps, killed in an accident when fire broke out in Hedge Tunnel, near Loos.
376	Vincent Patrick Taylor	17 December 1912	Born in Sydney, New South Wales in 1874 he took his certificate on a Bristol Biplane at the Bristol School, Salisbury Plain. He later performed balloon and parachute stunts around Australia using the name "Captain Taylor Penfold". He died in 1930.
377	Lt. Reginald Mills, Royal Fusiliers	17 December 1912	–
378	Lt. Edward Roux Littledale Corballis, Royal Dublin Fusiliers	17 December 1912	1890–1967 Later a Wing Commander in the Royal Air Force, awarded the DSO and appointed an OBE
379	Lt. Robert Valentine Pollok, 15th Hussars	17 December 1912	1884–1979 Retired in 1941 as a major-general.
380	Engine Room Artificer Frank Susans RN	17 December 1912	1885–1955 Later served in the Royal Air Force as a Flying Officer until 1920 and was a civilian engineer at RAF Halton in 1939.
381	Leading Seaman George Prickett RN	17 December 1912	1886– Later served in the Royal Air Force
382	Sub-Lt. George William Winsmore Hooper RN	17 December 1912	1892–1923 Killed in Hong Kong in a motoring accident while serving on HMS Hawkins

== See also ==
Lists for other years:

- 1910
- 1911
- 1912
- 1913
- 1914
- List of pilots with foreign Aviator's Certificates accredited by the Royal Aero Club 1910-1914
