= George Arthur Barnes =

- Born: 19 July 1883; Hoxton, London, England
- Died: 1 February 1919 (aged 35); Paddington, London, England
- Occupation: Pilot
- Known for: Motorcyclist and pioneer aviator

George Arthur Barnes (19 July 1883 – 1 February 1919) was an English racing motorcyclist and a pioneer aviator.

== Early life ==
Barnes was born at Hoxton, London on 19 July 1883. He attended school at North House School Crawley.

== Cycling ==
His first pedal cycle race in Southend was over Easter weekend in April 1901. He earned the 1 mile tandem cycle record at Crystal Palace on 8 October 1901. He also earned the one hour and 50 miles records at Crystal Palace on 19 June 1902.

== Motorcycles ==
Between 1904 and 1905, Barnes was in a partnership with George Wilton, manufacturing and selling motorcycles as George A. Barnes & Co.; the partnership was dissolved on 17 August 1905.

== Aviation ==
On 21 June 1910, Barnes flew a Humber monoplane at Brooklands to gain the Royal Aero Club's Aviator's Certificate No. 16, although he was already employed by the Humber company as a pilot. In the 1911 Census of Lewisham, he described himself as an aviator living at the Crown and Anchor in Lewisham with his widowed mother.

He died of Pneumonia on 1 February 1919 at Paddington, London.
