= Cecil Francis Kilner =

English military aviator (1883–1925)

- Born: 8 October 1883; Kemsing, Kent, England
- Died: 20 October 1925 (aged 42); London, England
- Burial place: Kensal Green Cemetery
- Military career
- Allegiance: United Kingdom
- Branch: Royal Marines; Royal Naval Air Service; Royal Air Force
- Service years: 1902–1925
- Rank: Group Captain
- Nickname: Jo
- Awards: Distinguished Service Order

Group Captain Cecil Francis Kilner, DSO*, ADC (8 October 1883 – 20 October 1925) was an early English aviator and pilot in the 1914 Cuxhaven Raid. He was awarded two Distinguished Service Orders during service with the Royal Naval Air Service during the First World War, he died as a Royal Air Force Group Captain in 1925 after a short illness.

== Early life ==
Kilner was born on 8 October 1883 in Kemsing, Kent 12 April 1887 the son of William and Frances Kilner.

== Royal Marines ==
He graduated from the Royal Military College at Sandhurst, and was commissioned a second lieutenant in the Royal Marine Light Infantry on 1 September 1902. In the 1911 Census he was described as a Lieutenant of the Royal Marines Light Infantry aboard HMS Swiftsure in the Grand Harbour, Malta.

== Royal Naval Air Service ==
On 22 October 1913 he was awarded the Aviators Certificate #667 from the Royal Aero Club following flights at the Central Flying School at Upavon, Wiltshire and went on to serve with the Royal Naval Air Service.

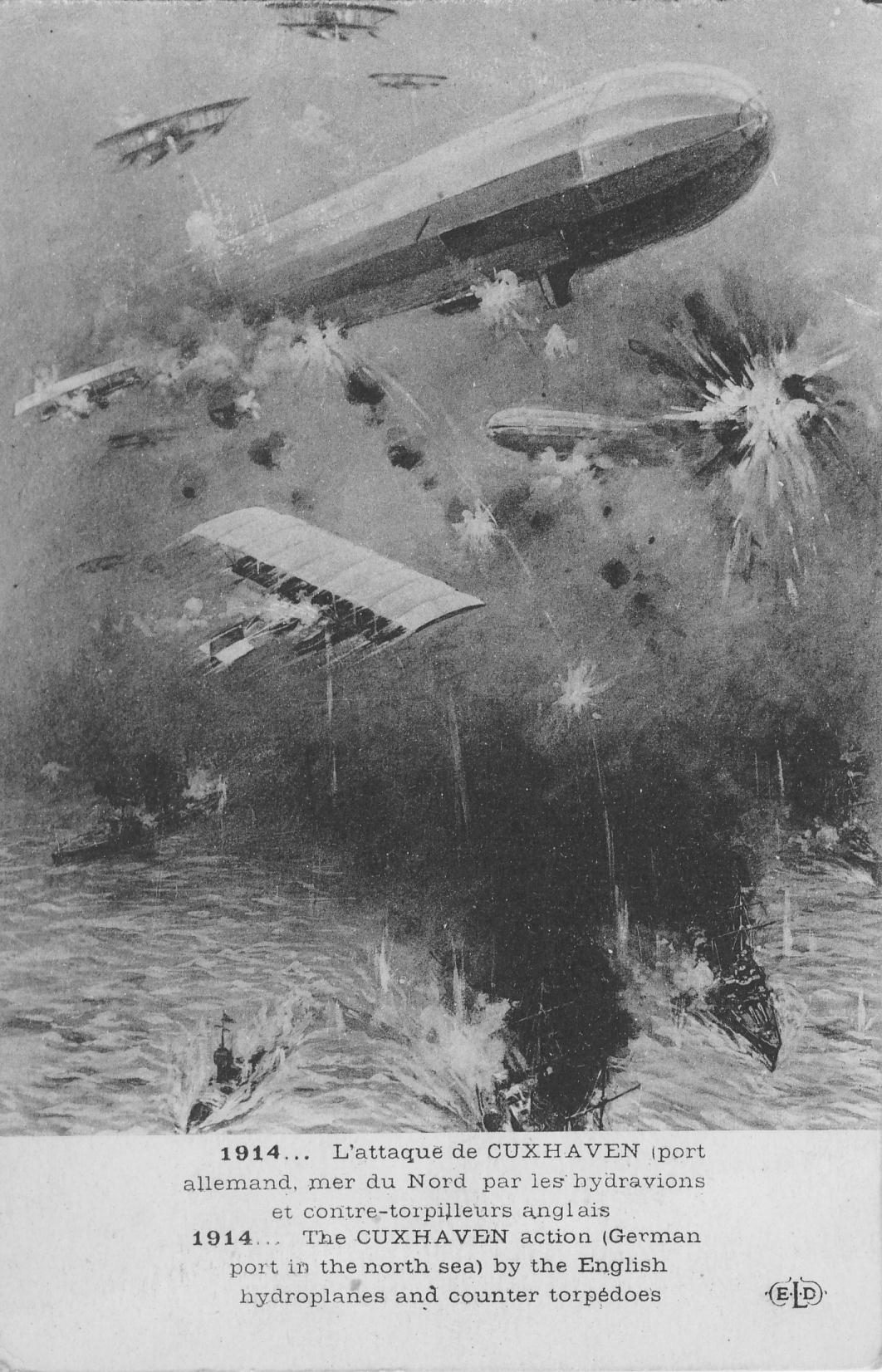
Cuxhaven Raid

On Christmas Day 1914 he took part in the Cuxhaven Raid for which he was awarded the DSO. The raid was an air reconnaissance flight in the Heligoland Bight with an opportunity to bomb German facilities. The aircraft were launched from seaplane-carriers, which were supported by destroyers and light cruisers, at first light, with bad weather the aircraft had to fly low. The low flying aircraft and the supporting ships were attacked by defending forces with submarines, seaplanes and Zeppelins. Kilner with his observer Erskine Childers flying a Short Admiralty Type 135 was one of the few who managed to return to his ship.

== Royal Air Force ==
In 1919 he transferred to the new Royal Air Force with a permanent commission as a Major. In early 1925 he was appointed as Air Aide-de-Camp to the King but he died soon after in London on 20 October 1925 at 16 Beaumont Street, London.

== Honours and awards ==
- 19 February 1915 – Captain Cecil Francis Kilner, RNLI (Flight Commander) is awarded the Distinguished Service Order for distinguished service on the combined operations by HM Ships and Naval Seaplanes on 25 December 1914.
- 1 October 1917 – Squadron Cd. Cecil Franscis Kilner, DSO, RNAS (Capt, temp Major RMLI) a bar to the Distinguished Service Order for services in reconnaissance and bombing flights in the eastern Mediterranean.
