= Mahl =

Mahl or MAHL may refer to:

- Mahls, the third subgroup of the Dhivehi people native to Minicoy Island, India
- Mahl dialect, of the Dhivehi language spoken on Minicoy Island, India
- Mahl writing systems, for the Mahl dialect of the Maldivian language
- Mahl (town), Andhra Pradesh, India
- Mahl (surname), a surname
- Mahl, Texas, an unincorporated community in Nacogdoches County
- Mahl-i-zan, a village in Valdian Rural District, Ivughli District, Khoy County, West Azerbaijan Province, Iran
- Mid-Atlantic Hockey League, a minor professional hockey league in USA
- Mahl Aynin (c. 1830–31 – 1910), Saharan Moorish religious and political leader

== See also ==
- Mahlstick or maulstick, a stick with a soft leather or padded head used by painters to support the hand holding the paintbrush
- Nathan Mahl, a Canadian progressive rock band formed in 1981
