= Mahl (surname) =

Mahl is a surname. Notable people with the surname include:

- Claire Mahl Moore (1912–1988), American artist
- Emil Mahl (1899–1967)
- Evald Mahl (1915–2001), Estonian basketball player
- Victor Mahl (1889–1915), English aviator
