= List of pilots awarded an Aviator's Certificate by the Royal Aero Club in 1914 =

The Royal Aero Club issued Aviators Certificates from 1910. These were internationally recognised under the Fédération Aéronautique Internationale.

== List ==
Aviator's Certificates awarded
| in 1910 (1–38) | in 1911 (39–168) | in 1912 (169–382) | in 1913 (383–719) | in 1914 (720–1032) |

Legend

Individual was killed in an aviation accident.
Individual was killed flying in military action.

Royal Aero Club certificates awarded in 1914 (nos. 720–1032)
| No. | Name | Date | Comment |
|---|---|---|---|
| 720 | Captain Robert John Lillywhite RFC | 1 January 1914 | Died 26 November 1916 (killed in "an aeroplane accident at the Front", aged 23), nephew of the famous cricketer James Lillywhite. |
| 721 | Sub-Lt. Franklin Geoffrey Saunders RNVR | 1 January 1914 | Franklin Saunders was a World War I flying ace credited with eight aerial victories. |
| 722 | Hugh Barnes Martindale | 1 January 1914 | Used a Vickers Biplane at the Vickers School at Brooklands. Later served with the Royal Flying Corps and Royal Air Force. |
| 723 | Edmund James Fulton | 3 January 1914 | Used a Vickers Biplane at the Vickers School at Brooklands. |
| 724 | Lt. H.E.M. Watkins RNR | 15 January 1914 | Took part in the Battle of Rufiji Delta in which the German battleship Königsberg was sunk; died 25 July 1972. |
| 725 | Sub-Lt. J.R.W. Smyth-Pigott RN | 15 January 1914 | Later promoted to group captain and Station Commander RAF Worthy Down. Died 8 October 1971 |
| 726 | Lt. J.T. Cull RN | 15 January 1914 | Took part in the Battle of Rufiji Delta in which the German battleship Königsberg was sunk; died 12 April 1962 |
| 727 | Commander Mansfield Cumming RN | 10 November 1913 | Died 14 June 1923 Also held French licence #1568 |
| 728 | Frederick George Dunn | 23 January 1914 | Died, together with co-pilot Percy Townley Rawlings, test-flying the Tarrant Tabor at R.A.E. Farnborough on 26 May 1919. |
| 729 | Herbert Ambrose Cooper | 27 January 1914 | First New Zealander to join the Royal Flying Corps, killed in France 21 June 1916. |
| 730 | Lt. Marmaduke Henry Monckton RA | 28 January 1914 | Killed whilst flying (KWF) 9 July 1915 with 8 Sqn. |
| 731 | Edward Fraser Norris | 28 January 1914 | Captain with the Royal Flying Corps killed in an aircraft accident 15 March 1918. |
| 732 | Filip Augustin Björklund | 3 February 1914 | (1886-1967) From Sweden became a civilian and military instructor in the United States. |
| 733 | Lt. Francis Hesketh Prichard RGA | 10 February 1914 | Died in South Russia on 1 February 1920 and buried in Novorossisk New Cemetery. |
| 734 | Capt. Arthur Burdett Burdett | 10 February 1914 | - |
| 735 | Lt. Dudley Stuart Kays Crosbie | 16 February 1914 | - |
| 736 | Lt. Frank Burges Binney | 16 February 1914 | - |
| 737 | Richard Patrick Creagh | 16 February 1914 | - |
| 738 | John Percival Clark | 16 February 1914 | - |
| 739 | Sub-Lt. Hans Acworth Busk RNR | 17 February 1914 | - |
| 740 | Lt. Charles Edward Robinson RMLI | 19 February 1914 | - |
| 741 | Lt. Harry Macleod Fraser RN | 25 February 1914 | - |
| 742 | William John Stutt | 25 February 1914 | Missing with Sgt A. G. Dalzell, 23 September 1920. |
| 743 | Capt. Alexander Ross-Hume | 25 February 1914 | - |
| 744 | 2nd Lt. James Lee Jackson | 26 February 1914 | - |
| 745 | Sub-Lt. John Charles Spencer-Warwick RNVR | 26 February 1914 | - |
| 746 | 2nd Lt. W.W.A. Burn, New Zealand Staff Corps | 24 February 1914 | - |
| 747 | Leading Seaman Frank Barnshaw RN | 26 February 1914 | - |
| 748 | A.M. 1st Class Thomas Warren | 26 February 1914 | - |
| 749 | Alfred Edward Barrs | 7 March 1914 | - |
| 750 | Denis George Murray | 11 March 1914 | - |
| 751 | Lt. Henry Allen Edridge-Green, 6th Battalion, Duke of Cambridge's Own (Middlesex Regiment) | 23 March 1914 | (1894-1918) Died on 5 November 1918 at Castle Mount Hospital, Dover while serving as a lieutenant with the Royal Air Force at the Capel Airship Station. |
| 752 | Jack Benjamin Graham | 23 March 1914 | - |
| 753 | Cyril Frederick Lan-Davis | 24 March 1914 | (1887-1915) Died on 14 October 1915 while serving as a flight lieutenant with the Royal Naval Air Service assigned to HMS Ark Royal. Known as an inventor and writer on telephotography. |
| 754 | Lt. Victor Somerset Erskine Lindop, Prince of Wales's Leinster Regiment | 24 March 1914 | (1890-1978) |
| 755 | Lt. Wilmsdorff George Mansergh, Manchester Regiment | 25 March 1914 | Killed in Action France 26 August 1914 aged 32 |
| 756 | Lt. Arthur Sheridan Barratt RFA | 26 March 1914 | Died 4 November 1966 |
| 757 | Sgt. Charles Albert Hobby RFC | 27 March 1914 | Died 7 April 1961 |
| 758 | Capt. Ernest Arthur Hunter Fell, 12th Bengal Cavalry | 27 March 1914 | - |
| 759 | Leading Seaman Stephen Thomas Clemens RN | 2 April 1914 | - |
| 760 | John Bankes Price | 3 April 1914 | - |
| 761 | Lt. Athelstan Key Durance George, 1st Battalion, Dorsetshire Regiment | 3 April 1914 | - |
| 762 | 2nd Lt. John Bruce Bolitho, Devonshire Regiment | 15 April 1914 | - |
| 763 | Prince Leon Sapieha de Koden | 15 April 1914 | 1883-1944 Polish |
| 764 | 2nd. Lt. John Bower Harman RFA | 15 April 1914 | - |
| 765 | Oswald Lancaster | 15 April 1914 | - |
| 766 | Comte Jacques de Fitz-James | 16 April 1914 | - |
| 767 | Ernest Victor Samuel Wilberforce | 16 April 1914 | - |
| 768 | Mark Dawson | 16 April 1914 | - |
| 769 | George Carruthers | 21 April 1914 | - |
| 770 | Geoffrey Charles Gold | 21 April 1914 | - |
| 771 | Lt. Philip Stafford Myburgh RFA | 21 April 1914 | - |
| 772 | Lt. Reynell Henry Vemey, ASC | 22 April 1914 | - |
| 773 | Lt. William Henry Dyke Acland | 22 April 1914 | - |
| 774 | W.R. Ding | 27 April 1914 | - |
| 775 | Air Mechanic Arthur James Locker | 28 April 1914 | - |
| 776 | Eric Parker | 29 April 1914 | - |
| 777 | Lt. William Annesley Underhill, Worcestershire Regiment | 10 May 1914 | - |
| 778 | Robert John MacGeagh Hurst | 10 May 1914 | - |
| 779 | 2nd Lt. Cuthbert Euan Charles Rabagliati, King's Own Yorkshire Light Infantry | 11 May 1914 | - |
| 780 | Frazier Curtis | 11 May 1914 | - |
| 781 | 2nd Lt. John Aidan Liddell | 14 May 1914 | - |
| 782 | Reginald Max Maximilian Murray | 14 May 1914 | - |
| 783 | Michael Geoffrey Smiles | 14 May 1914 | - |
| 784 | Victor Mahl | 14 May 1914 | Chief Engineer of the Sopwith Aviation Company, died of appendicitis in 1915 |
| 785 | Benjamin Herbert Piercy | 18 May 1914 | - |
| 786 | Bernard Francis Hale | 18 May 1914 | - |
| 787 | Major Edward H. Phillips | 19 May 1914 | - |
| 788 | Capt. Alfred Garnet Moore | 19 May 1914 | - |
| 789 | Lt. Norman Wood-Smith | 20 May 1914 | - |
| 790 | Lt. John Burgh Talbot Leighton | 20 May 1914 | Capt. John Burgh Talbot Leighton, 'C' Flight Commander (June 1915), later Major, CO 23 Sqn, killed while flying 7 May 1917 |
| 791 | Lt. Gerald Desmond Mills, Sherwood Foresters | 22 May 1914 | - |
| 792 | Robert Eugene Lagrange | 22 May 1914 | - |
| 793 | Corporal Arthur Claud Robins RFC | 21 May 1914 | - |
| 794 | Lt. Ian Malcolm Bonham-Carter, Northumberland Fusiliers | 25 May 1914 | Later Air Commodore |
| 795 | Leonard Parker | 28 May 1914 | - |
| 796 | Percy Herbert Maskell | 28 May 1914 | - |
| 797 | Lt. Gerald Goodwin Carpenter, 1st Battalion, Suffolk Regiment | 29 May 1914 | - |
| 798 | Lt. John Collins, 3rd Battalion, Hampshire Regiment | 29 May 1914 | - |
| 799 | Henry Racine-Jaques | 29 May 1914 | - |
| 800 | Thomas Smith Duncan | 30 May 1914 | - |
| 801 | Ronald Portman Cannon | 30 May 1914 | Reserve Pilot on RNAS air raid on Zeppelin Base at Friedrichshafen, November 1914 |
| 802 | Midshipman David Sigismund Don RN | 2 June 1914 | - |
| 803 | Lt. Kenneth Reid Van der Spuy, South African Army | 2 June 1914 | - |
| 804 | Sub-Lt. Lancelot Tomkinson RN | 2 June 1914 | - |
| 805 | Archibald Maskell | 2 June 1914 | - |
| 806 | George Evelyn Cowley | 3 June 1914 | - |
| 807 | George John Lusted | 3 June 1914 | - |
| 808 | Charles Weber | 5 June 1914 | - |
| 809 | Rupert Henry Steinbach | 6 June 1914 | - |
| 810 | John Philip Wilson | 8 June 1914 | - |
| 811 | Lt. John Edward Tennent, Scots Guards | 9 June 1914 | - |
| 812 | Geoffrey Hugh Eastwood | 9 June 1914 | - |
| 813 | John Lankester Parker | 18 June 1914 | Chief test pilot of Shorts from 1918 until 1945 |
| 814 | Reginald Chambers | 18 June 1914 | - |
| 815 | Laurence Gresley | 19 June 1914 | - |
| 816 | Lt. Bernard Edward Smythies RE | 19 June 1914 | Served in the RAF 1914 - 1918, killed while flying on 27 June 1930. |
| 817 | Lt. Francis Hermann Eberli RGA | 24 June 1914 | - |
| 818 | Midshipman Geoffrey Cayley Lambert Dalley RN | 24 June 1914 | - |
| 819 | Lt. Leslie Fitzroy Richard RGA | 24 June 1914 | - |
| 820 | Lt. Charles Nugent, Royal Berkshire Regiment | 24 June 1914 | - |
| 821 | Capt. Henry Edward Charles Walcot | 24 June 1914 | - |
| 822 | Lt. Gordon Shergold Creed, S.A. Defence Force | 24 June 1914 | - |
| 823 | Lt. Basil Hobson Turnerv | 24 June 1914 | - |
| 824 | Sub-Lt. Herbert Graham Wanklyn RNR | 24 June 1914 | - |
| 825 | John Gordon Miller | 26 June 1914 | - |
| 826 | Ronald Stuart McGregor | 26 June 1914 | - |
| 827 | Capt. Gerard Percy Wallace, S.A. Defence Force | 29 June 1914 | - |
| 828 | Lt. Gilbert Lindsay Farie, Highland Light Infantry | 30 June 1914 | - |
| 829 | Dennis Gwynne | 30 June 1914 | - |
| 830 | William Henry Charlesworth | 1 July 1914 | - |
| 831 | John Edmund Burnet Thornely | 5 July 1914 | - |
| 832 | Lt. Edwin Cheere Emmett, S.A. Defence Force | 9 June 1914 | - |
| 833 | Sub-Lt. Frederick Barr RNR | 9 July 1914 | - |
| 834 | Capt. John Francis Aloysius Kane, 2nd Battalion, Devonshire Regiment | 9 July 1914 | - |
| 835 | William Harold Treloar | 9 July 1914 | - |
| 836 | Charles Cayley Godwin | 9 July 1914 | - |
| 837 | William Donovan South | 9 July 1914 | - |
| 838 | 1st Class A.M. William Boyle Power RFC | 1 July 1914 | - |
| 839 | Master Mariner Alfred William Clemson RNR | 14 July 1914 | - |
| 840 | Lt. Alastair St. John Munro Warrand, Black Watch | 14 July 1914 | - |
| 841 | Thomas Forster Rutledge | 14 July 1914 | - |
| 842 | Rear-Admiral Mark Edward Frederic Kerr | 14 July 1914 | - |
| 843 | Percy Dickson Robinson | 16 July 1914 | - |
| 844 | 1st Class Stoker Henry John Lloyd RN | 17 July 1914 | - |
| 845 | William Campbell Adamson | 17 July 1914 | - |
| 846 | Stephenson MacGordon | 17 July 1914 | - |
| 847 | John Scott Bradbury Winter | 18 July 1914 | - |
| 848 | Henry Pagan Lowe | 20 July 1914 | - |
| 849 | Arthur Gelston Shepherd | 21 July 1914 | - |
| 850 | 1st Air Mechanic William Percy Parker | 21 July 1914 | - |
| 851 | Lt. Thomas Ralph Wells, 33rd Punjabis | 21 July 1914 | - |
| 852 | Lt. Angus George Gillman RHA | 21 July 1914 | - |
| 853 | Capt. Harry Tailyour Lumsden, Cameron Highlanders | 22 July 1914 | - |
| 854 | Thomas Hinshelwood | 27 July 1914 | - |
| 855 | Air Mechanic Victor Clarence Judge RFC | 21 July 1914 | - |
| 856 | Frances Alec Arcier | 28 July 1914 | - |
| 857 | Lt. George Aubrey Kennedy Lawrence RFA | 2S July 1914 | - |
| 858 | Lt. Edgar Ralph Coles | 28 July 1914 | - |
| 859 | Albert Throne Crick | 29 July 1914 | - |
| 860 | Lt. James Donald Gerhardt Sanders RFA | 30 July 1914 | On a Boxkite of the Bristol School of Flying - the last pre-war certificate awarded at Brooklands. |
| 861 | Flight-Sgt. Hugh McGrane RFC | 30 July 1914 | - |
| 862 | Sgt.-Maj. Frederick Henry Unwin | 3 August 1914 | - |
| 863 | Sgt. Alfred Robert May | 4 August 1914 | - |
| 864 | Sgt. Frank James RFC | 28 July 1914 | - |
| 865 | Graham Weir | 10 August 1914 | - |
| 866 | William Mortimer-Phelan | 9 August 1914 | - |
| 867 | Flight Sub-Lt. Norman Sholto Douglas, RNAS | 11 August 1914 | First to qualify at the new Military School at Brooklands |
| 868 | Frederick Whittington Gamwell | 15 August 1914 | - |
| 869 | Lionel Seymour Collins | 15 August 1914 | - |
| 870 | Lt. Evelyn Paget Graves RFA. | 18 August 1914 | Major, commanding 60 Squadron RFC. Killed in aerial action over Beaumetz, 6 March 1917. Buried at Avesnes-le-Comte, Pas de Calais. |
| 871 | George Llewellyn Pitt | 19 August 1914 | - |
| 872 | Eric Barton Palmer | 20 August 1914 | - |
| 873 | Gordon Lindsay Thomson | 20 August 1914 | (1884–1953) Served in the RNAS at Gallipoli (DSC, 1915), and in the RAF on the Western Front (DFC, 1918). |
| 874 | Francis Thomas Courtney | 20 August 1914 | - |
| 875 | Flight Sub-Lt. William Hayland Wilson RNAS | 21 August 1914 | - |
| 876 | Flight Sub-Lt. Anthony Rex Arnold RNAS | 21 August 1914 | - |
| 877 | Sub-Lt. Arthur Lorne Nickerson RN | 22 August 1914 | - |
| 878 | Engine Room Artificer John Watson Jean RN | 19 August 1914 | - |
| 879 | Flight Sub-Lt. James Douglas Maude RN | 19 August 1914 | - |
| 880 | Richard Cecil Hardstaff | 20 August 1914 | (1894-1979) Served with the Royal Naval Air Service |
| 881 | Petchell Burtt Murray | 21 August 1914 | (1884-1914) Royal Naval Air Service died in flying accident 4 November 1914 |
| 882 | William Orchard Usher Purnell | 21 August 1914 | - |
| 883 | Master Mariner Richard Upton | 26 August 1914 | - |
| 884 | Lt. John Lawson Kinnear, The King's Regiment | 11 September 1914 | - |
| 885 | 2nd Lt. Derick Robertson Aikman RFC, SR | 11 September 1914 | - |
| 886 | Lt. Charles Carleton Barry, 3rd Battalion, Leinster Regiment | 11 September 1914 | - |
| 887 | Lt. Edgar Ramsey Ludlow-Hewitt, Royal Irish Rifles | 19 August 1914 | - |
| 888 | Felix Ruffi | 29 August 1914 | - |
| 889 | Elmer Peter Roberts | 29 August 1914 | - |
| 890 | Andrew Y.K.R. Cheung | 31 August 1914 | - |
| 891 | Capt. Oliver Nash Moriarty, Antrim RGA, SR | 2 September 1914 | - |
| 892 | Capt. Andrew Adolphus Walser, London Regiment | 2 September 1914 | Later air commodore. |
| 893 | Lt. Jocelyn Morton Lucas, 4th Battalion, Royal Warwickshire Regiment | 3 September 1914 | - |
| 894 | Lt. William Adam Sedgwick Rough | 3 September 1914 | - |
| 895 | Capt. Cecil Harry Wolff, Bedfordshire Regiment | 4 September 1914 | - |
| 896 | Second-Lt. John Reginald Howett RFC | 8 September 1914 | - |
| 897 | Capt. Arthur Douglas Gaye | 8 September 1914 | - |
| 898 | Cyril Marconi Crowe | 8 September 1914 | First World War Royal Flying Corps ace, died 1974. |
| 899 | Flight Sub-Lt. Ralph Whitehead RNAS | 8 September 1914 | - |
| 900 | Flight Sub-Lt. Ralph James Hope-Vere RNAS | 9 September 1914 | - |
| 901 | William Roche Kelly | 9 September 1914 | - |
| 902 | Charles Henry Butler | 6 September 1914 | - |
| 903 | Corporal Frederick Adams RFC | 20 August 1914 | - |
| 904 | Lt. Henry Graham Lambarde Mayne, King's Own Scottish Borderers | 9 September 1914 | - |
| 905 | Robert Maxwell Pike | 21 September 1914 | - |
| 906 | Flight Sub-Lt. The Hon. Desmond O'Brien RNAS | 21 September 19 | - |
| 907 | Flight Sub-Lt. Philip Leslie Holmes RNAS | 21 September 1914 | - |
| 908 | John Callaghan Brooke | 21 September 1914 | - |
| 909 | Claude Francis Strickland, ICS | 22 September 1914 | - |
| 910 | James Gordon McKinley | 22 September 1914 | - |
| 911 | Flight Sub-Lt. Bernard Crossley Meates RNAS | 23 September 1914 | - |
| 912 | Harry O'Hagan | 23 September 1914 | - |
| 913 | Oswald Mansell Moullin | 24 September 1914 | - |
| 914 | 2nd Lt. Frederick William Polehampton, 14th Reserve Cavalry Regiment, 15th (The King's) Hussars | 27 September 1914 | - |
| 915 | Reginald Lord | 27 September 1914 | - |
| 916 | Flight Sub-Lt. Maurice Arthur Haines RNAS | 30 September 1914 | - |
| 917 | Flight Sub-Lt. Harold Rosher RNAS | 30 September 1914 | - |
| 918 | Gerald Charles Ross Mumby | 1 October 1914 | - |
| 919 | Flight Sub-Lt. Francis Warrington-Strong RNAS | 2 October 1914 | - |
| 920 | Lt. Arthur Bracton Bagley, Royal Dublin Fusiliers | 2 October 1914 | - |
| 921 | Capt. Harold Wyllie, 9th (Cyclist) Battalion, Hampshire Regiment | 1 September 1914 | - |
| 922 | 2nd Lt. William Francis Forbes-Sempill RFC | 29 September 1914 | Forbes-Semphill led a technical mission to Japan in 1921 to help the Japanese Navy develop naval aviation. He held several records for long-distance flights and was leading figure in the Royal Aeronautical Society, of which he was president. |
| 923 | Charles Henry Chichester Smith | 2 October 1914 | - |
| 924 | Lt. Eric Walker, 6th Battalion, Border Regiment | 4 October 1914 | - |
| 925 | Flight Sub-Lieut. Philip Charles Vere Perry RNAS | 5 October 1914 | - |
| 926 | Thomas Walker Abbott | 7 October 1914 | - |
| 927 | Peter Legh | 8 October 1914 | - |
| 928 | Malcolm McBean Bell-Irving | 9 October 1914 | A Canadian from Vancouver who served with the Royal Flying Corps during the First World War winning a Military Cross and Distinguished Service Order. |
| 929 | George Crosfield Norris Nicholson | 9 October 1914 | Was serving as a captain in the Royal Flying Corps when he was killed while flying at Gosport, Hampshire, on 11 March 1916, aged 31. |
| 930 | Donald Campbell MacLachlan | 9 October 1914 | - |
| 931 | Beaufoi John Warwick Montressor Moore | 10 October 1914 | Killed 10 June 1917 in a flying accident while serving as a captain in the Royal Flying Corps. |
| 932 | Rupert Forbes-Bentley | 8 October 1914 | - |
| 933 | Flight Sub-Lt. Edwin Rowland Moon RNAS | 10 October 1914 | Won DSO and bar during World War I. Commanded the Seaplane Experimental Station at Felixstowe after the war; killed in flying boat crash 29 April 1920. |
| 934 | Flight Sub-Lt. Kenneth Stevens Savory RNAS | 29 September 1914 | - |
| 935 | Flight Sub-Lt. David Keith Johnston RNAS | 1 October 1914 | - |
| 936 | Flight Sub-Lt. Vincent Nicholl RNAS | 8 October 1914 | - |
| 937 | Flight Sub-Lt. Francis Gilmer Tempest Dawson RNAS | 8 October 1914 | - |
| 938 | Flight Sub-Lt. Maurice Edward Arthur Wright RNAS | 8 October 1914 | - |
| 939 | Flight Sub-Lt. Edward Gordon Riggall RNAS | 11 October 1914 | - |
| 940 | Ormond George Hake | 15 October 1914 | Died 14 May 1916 as a lieutenant in the Royal Flying Corps aged 19. He died during a test flight of a newly built aircraft. |
| 941 | Capt. Thomas Walter Colby Carthew, 4th Battalion, Bedfordshire Regiment | 16 October 1914 | - |
| 942 | Flight Sub-Lt. John Joseph Petre RNAS | 14 October 1914 | Died in a flying accident on 13 April 1917, Acting Sqn. Cmdr. J.J. Petre, DSC. |
| 943 | Alexander Burnell Rendall | 19 October 1914 | - |
| 944 | 2nd Lt. Cecil Harloven Saunders RFC | 21 October 1914 | - |
| 945 | Flight Sub-Lt. Arthur Ethelbert Griffin RNAS | 21 October 1914 | - |
| 946 | Flight Sub-Lt. Reginald Eycott Nicoll RNAS | 21 October 1914 | - |
| 947 | Flight Sub-Lt. Joseph Alexander Allen RNAS | 23 October 1914 | - |
| 948 | Flight Lt. Christopher Hornby RNAS | 24 October 1914 | - |
| 949 | Flight Sub-Lt. Edwin Harris Dunning RNAS | 24 October 1914 | - |
| 950 | Flight Sub-Lt. Tom Harry England RNAS | 25 October 1914 | - |
| 951 | Flight Sub-Lt. Evan Bernard Morgan RNAS | 25 October 1914 | - |
| 952 | Cyril Charles Wigram | 26 October 1914 | - |
| 953 | Flight Sub-Lt. Marmaduke Scott Marsden RNAS | 26 October 1914 | - |
| 954 | Malcolm Grahame Christie | 27 October 1914 | - |
| 955 | Flight Sub-Lt. Allan Knighton Robertson RNAS | 5 November 1914 | - |
| 956 | Flight Lt. John William Kidston Allsop RNAS | 5 November 1914 | - |
| 957 | Lionel Franklin Beynon | 5 November 1914 | - |
| 958 | William Harry Ellison RN | 6 November 1914 | - |
| 959 | Flight Sub-Lt. Aylmer Fitzwarine Bettington RNAS | 6 November 1914 | - |
| 960 | Julian Pauncefote Inglefield | 7 November 1914 | - |
| 961 | Flight Sub-Lt. John Martin d'Arcy Levy RNAS | 23 September 1914 | - |
| 962 | Flight Sub-Lt. Bertrand Lawrence Huskisson RNAS | 28 October 1914 | - |
| 963 | Sergt. William Sharpe RFC | 6 November 1914 | - |
| 964 | John Harold Rose | 7 November 1914 | (1894-1915) Died as a sub-lieutenant with the Royal Naval Air Service during the Gallipoli Campaign |
| 965 | Jesse Albert Easter | 7 November 1914 | (1890-1971) |
| 966 | Lt. Eustace Osborne Grenfell, DCLI | 9 November 1914 | (1890-1964) retired as Royal Air Force group captain |
| 967 | Robert William Alexander Ivermee | 10 November 1914 | - |
| 968 | 1st Class Air Mechanic James Douglas Clarke | 28 October 1914 | |
| 969 | Commander R.M. Groves RN | 15 November 1914 | - |
| 970 | Flight Sub-Lt. Douglas Iron RNAS | 28 October 1914 | - |
| 971 | 2nd Lt. John Eustace Arthur Baldwin, 8th King's Royal Irish Hussars | 17 November 1914 | - |
| 972 | 2nd Lt. Erik Harrison Mitchell | 17 November 1914 | - |
| 973 | Francisco Carabajal | 18 November 1914 | - |
| 974 | Capt. Gerald William Huntbach, 4th Battalion, King's Shropshire Light Infantry | iS November 1914 | - |
| 975 | Lt. Alan John Lance Scott, Sussex Yeomanry | 20 November 1914 | - |
| 976 | Alfred Huggins | 24 November 1914 | Later RFC Director of Aircraft Equipment and brigadier-general. |
| 977 | Flight Sub-Lt. Eric John Hodsoll RNAS | 25 November 1914 | - |
| 978 | Flight Sub-Lt. Eric Fabricius Bray RNAS | 25 November 1914 | - |
| 979 | Lt. Michael Lloyd Braithwaite | 25 November 1914 | (1881-1915) Died in France 17 May 1915 serving with the Royal Flying Corps |
| 980 | Flight Sub-Lt. John Osborn Groves RNAS | 25 November 1914 | - |
| 981 | Edward Stanley Skipper | 25 November 1914 | - |
| 982 | Flight Sub-Lt. Edmund Ivan Montfort Bird RNAS | 25 November 1914 | - |
| 983 | William Geoffrey Moore | 26 November 1914 | - |
| 984 | 2nd Lt. Clifford Alban Hooper RFC | 18 November 1914 | - |
| 985 | Lt. Charles Stuart Burnett, Highland Light Infantry | 24 November 1914 | - |
| 986 | Frank Sowter Barnwell | 9 December 1914 | (1880-1938) and aeronautical engineer and aircraft designer, died in an aircraft designed and built by himself on 2 August 1938 |
| 987 | Flight Sub-Lt. Guy William Price RNAS | 9 December 1914 | - |
| 988 | Flight Sub-Lt. Bernard Osbourne Ffield RNAS | 10 December 1914 | - |
| 989 | John Claude Horsey Barfield | 12 December 1914 | - |
| 990 | Charles Percival Wilson | 14 December 1914 | - |
| 991 | Flight Sub-Lt. Thomas Spencer RNAS | 27 October 1914 | - |
| 992 | Flight Sub-Lt. Edward John Cooper RNAS | 14 December 1914 | - |
| 993 | Flight Sub-Lt. Percy Ethelwyn Hunt Wakeley RNAS | 14 December 1914 | - |
| 994 | 2nd Lt. Malcolm David Methven | 14 December 1914 | (1891-1962) Married Helen Marion Watson, 16 December 1918, St. Paul's Toronto Canada. Lt-Col. O.C. Stores Depot. Died about December 1962 |
| 995 | 2nd Lt. Henry Bayly Reginald Grey-Edwards RFA | 14 December 1914 | - |
| 996 | George Gilbert Algernon Williams | 15 December 1914 | - |
| 997 | Stanley Graham Gilmour | 15 December 1914 | - |
| 998 | Lt. James Cecil Thornton RFA | 15 December 1914 | - |
| 999 | Flight Lt. Robert Hilton Jones RNAS | 17 December 1914 | - |
| 1000 | Flight Sub.-Lt. Roger Martin Field RNAS | 18 December 1914 | - |
| 1001 | Flight Sub-Lt. Kenneth Falshaw Watson RNAS | 19 December 1914 | missing in action, 1916 |
| 1002 | Maurice Leigh Gardner | 20 December 1914 | - |
| 1003 | Flight Sub-Lt. George Fred Breese RNAS | 19 December 1914 | - |
| 1004 | Flight Sub-Lt. Gerald Edward Livock RNAS | 20 December 1914 | - |
| 1005 | Flight Sub-Lt. Douglas Meston Barnes RNAS | 20 December 1914 | - |
| 1006 | Geoffrey Harold Brinkman McCall | 20 December 1914 | - |
| 1007 | Gino Virgilio | 20 December 1914 | - |
| 1008 | Ernest Alfred Edward Wood | 21 December 1914 | - |
| 1009 | Flight Sub-Lt. Walter Shackfield Newton-Clare RNAS | 20 December 1914 | - |
| 1010 | Flight Sub-Lt. Thomas Kenneth Young RNAS | 21 December 1914 | - |
| 1011 | Melville Richard Allen | 22 December 1914 | - |
| 1012 | Leo Francis Page | 22 December 1914 | - |
| 1013 | Lt. King Davie Harris, King's Own Scottish Borderers | 22 December 1914 | - |
| 1014 | Flight Sub-Lt. Harold James Batchelor RNAS | 22 December 1914 | - |
| 1015 | Ralph Christopher Freeman | 22 December 1914 | - |
| 1016 | Lionel Macdonald Wells Bladen | 22 December 1914 | - |
| 1017 | Flight Sub-Lt. William Laurie Welsh RNAS | 22 December 1914 | - |
| 1018 | Thomas Vaughan Lister | 23 December 1914 | (1893-1983) Bristol Biplane at the Royal Naval Air Station at Hendon. A sub-lieut in the Royal Naval Air Service, later a wing commander in the Royal Air Force. |
| 1019 | Flight Sub-Lt. Arthur Quilton Cooper RNAS | 23 December 1914 | - |
| 1020 | Flight Sub-Lt. Charles Beauvoir Dalison RNAS | 24 December 1914 | - |
| 1021 | 2nd Lt. Percy Gilbert Ross-Hume | 24 December 1914 | - |
| 1022 | Herbert Prinsep Somers Clogstoun | 24 December 1914 | (1886-1955) Maurice Farman Biplane at the Military School, Brooklands. An inspector of Agriculture Bank of Egypt. |
| 1023 | Robert Hobart Mayo | 24 December 1914 | Designer of the Short Mayo Composite piggy-back aircraft combination. |
| 1024 | Lt. Richard Williams, June, Commonwealth Military Forces | 12 November 1914 | Bristol Biplane at the Central Flying School at Werribee, Australia. |
| 1025 | Capt. Thomas Walter White, Commonwealth Military Forces | 14 November 1914 | Bristol Biplane at the Central Flying School at Werribee, Australia. |
| 1026 | Lt. George Pinnock Merz MB, BS | 14 November 1914 | (1891-1915) Bristol Biplane at the Central Flying School at Werribee, Australia. Member of the Australian Flying Corps, missing in action 30 July 1915 in Mesopotamia. |
| 1027 | 2nd Lt. David Thomas William Manwell | 16 November 1914 | - |
| 1028 | John Whitaker Woodhouse | 22 December 1914 | - |
| 1029 | Clarence Arthur Charles Winchester | 22 December 1914 | Journalist, author, novelist, editor and poet. |
| 1030 | Lt. Arthur Leslie Donaldson, Rifle Brigade | 26 December 1914 | (1893-1967) Maurice Farman biplane at the Netheravon Flying School at Netheravon. |
| 1031 | Lt. William Bowen Hargrave, Suffolk Regiment | 31 December 1914 | (1894-1973) Maurice Farman biplane at the Central Flying School at Upavon. Royal Flying Corps later a group captain in the Royal Air Force, awarded an OBE. |
| 1032 | 2nd Lt. Ewart Douglas Horsfall, Rifle Brigade | 31 December 1914 | Ewart Douglas Horsfall who won a gold medal for Great Britain rowing at the 1912 Summer Olympics He achieved a rare double of being awarded both the Military Cross (in 1916) and the Distinguished Flying Cross (in 1918). |

== See also ==
- List of pilots awarded an Aviator's Certificate by the Royal Aero Club in 1910
- List of pilots awarded an Aviator's Certificate by the Royal Aero Club in 1911
- List of pilots awarded an Aviator's Certificate by the Royal Aero Club in 1912
- List of pilots awarded an Aviator's Certificate by the Royal Aero Club in 1913
- List of pilots with foreign Aviator's Certificates accredited by the Royal Aero Club 1910-1914
