= Claude Bettington =

Claude Albemarle Bettington (13 May 1875, Cape Colony - 10 September 1912, Wolvercote, Oxfordshire, England) was a mining engineer and a pioneer aviator from South Africa.

== Early life ==
Claude Albemarle Bettington was the son of Col. Rowland Albemarle Bettington. He attended St. Andrew's College, Grahamstown from April to December 1890.

== Military service ==
At the start of the Boer War Bettington served in the Imperial Light Horse from its formation to May 1900, later a lieutenant in the Royal Field Artillery, 14th Battery from May 1900 to end of war.

== Engineering career ==
Bettington was a member of the Mechanical Engineers Assn. of the Witwatersrand and a member of the Chemical and Metallurgical Assn. of the Witwatersrand. and worked as a mining mechanical engineer from 1891 to outbreak of the Boer War in 1899. Bettington invented a new type of steam boiler. and together with Anthony M Robeson invented a boiler furnace for burning pulverized fuel.

== Aviation ==
Bettington, as a young officer serving with the Royal Artillery was fascinated by the possibilities which flying offered to the artillery regarding observation and reconnaissance. After learning to fly and becoming the first South African to take the Aviator's Certificate of the Royal Aero Club of the United Kingdom and the Fédération Aéronautique Internationale. Bettington transferred to the newly formed Royal Flying Corps. The autumn army manoeuvers of 1912 included the Royal Flying Corps for the first time. Bettington was paired with Edward Hochkiss, chief test pilot for the Bristol Aeroplane Company, to fly a Bristol Coanda Monoplane.

Taking-off from Larkhill at 07.00 on 10 September 1912 they flew directly to Port Meadow, Oxford which was the first stage. Arriving over Port Meadow at 2000 ft. On their approach for landing a quick-release catch holding a strap opened and the strap fractured a flying wire which whipped about, tearing a hole in the starboard wing. Fabric stripped off and control became impossible; the aircraft crashed into the ground at Lower Wolvercote, 120 yards (110 m) short of Port Meadow. Bettington was flung to his death from the aircraft and Hotchkiss perished in the ensuing impact.
