= List of pilots awarded an Aviator's Certificate by the Royal Aero Club in 1910 =

The UK Royal Aero Club issued Aviators Certificates from 1910. These were internationally recognised under the Fédération Aéronautique Internationale.

== List ==
Aviator's Certificates awarded
in 1910 (1–38)	in 1911 (39–168)	in 1912 (169–382)	in 1913 (383–719)	in 1914 (720–1032)

Legend

Individual was killed in an aviation accident.
Individual was killed flying in military action.

Royal Aero Club certificates awarded in 1910 (nos. 1–38)
No.	Name	Date	Comment
1	J. T. C. Moore-Brabazon	8 March 1910	Conducted the first flight by a British pilot in Britain; named on Eastchurch memorial to Pioneer Aviators. Minister for Aircraft Production in the Second World War. One of four honorary certificates issued.
2	Hon. Charles Stewart Rolls	8 March 1910	Killed in an air crash at Hengistbury Airfield Bournemouth on 12 July 1910 when the tail of his Wright Flyer broke off during a flying display; he was the first Briton to die in an aircraft accident; co-founder of Rolls-Royce; founding member of Royal Aero Club; named on Eastchurch memorial to Pioneer Aviators.One of four honorary certificates issued.
3	Alfred Rawlinson	5 April 1910	Pioneer motorist and aviator, soldier and intelligence officer. One of four honorary certificates issued.
4	Cecil Stanley Grace	12 April 1910	Disappeared on 22 December 1910 while attempting to win the de Forest Prize for the longest cross-channel flight completed by the end of the year (lost his way in fog); named on Eastchurch memorial to Pioneer Aviators.One of four honorary certificates issued.
5	George Bertram Cockburn	26 April 1910	Research chemist. Represented Britain in 1st international air race at Rheims; established first Army aerodrome at Larkhill; trained Royal Navy's first four pilots at Eastchurch; 1st Head of Air Accidents Branch of Department of Civil Aviation.
6	Claude Grahame-White	26 April 1910	One of the most influential aviation pioneers; publicist, author, aircraft engineer and manufacturer. Awarded the R.Ae.C.'s Gold Medal in 1910 for winning the Gordon Bennett Aviation Cup.
7	Alec Ogilvie	24 May 1910	Tested at Camber, near Rye using a Short-Wright. Named on Eastchurch memorial to Pioneer Aviators.
8	A. Mortimer Singer	31 May 1910	Benefactor and yachtsman (son of sewing-machine magnate Isaac Merritt Singer).
9	Samuel F. Cody	7 June 1910	Made first recognised aeroplane flight in Britain on 16 October 1908. Awarded the first R.Ae.C. Special certificate on 6 December 1911. Died on 7 August 1913, together with his passenger, W. H. B. Evans, when his Cody Floatplane suffered a structural failure.
10	Launcelot D. L. Gibbs	7 June 1910	Made short hops in the first Dunne D.1, the first swept-wing aeroplane, at Blair Atholl in Scotland in 1908. Later became internationally known.
11	Hon. Maurice Egerton	14 June 1910	Named on Eastchurch memorial to Pioneer Aviators.
12	James Radley	14 June 1910	Aircraft designer, together with Eric Gordon England (see below) and test pilot.
13	Hon. Alan Reginald Boyle	14 June 1910	Eighth child of the 7th Earl of Glasgow; founded the Scottish Aeroplane Syndicate in 1909. The Royal Aero Club index card recording Boyle's certificate is reproduced here
14	John Armstrong Drexel	21 June 1910	Flew with the French Lafayette Escadrille, a squadron of the French Air Service, the Aéronautique militaire, during World War I composed largely of American volunteer pilots flying fighters.
15	George Cyril Colmore	21 June 1910	The first Royal Navy officer to gain a Royal Aero Club Aviator's Licence. He made his first flight on 19 June 1910, flying Frank McClean's Short S.27 (Shorts' works no. S.26) for 11 miles in 20 minutes; the following day he passed the tests for the Pilot's Certificate, which was awarded at the Royal Aero Club's committee meeting on 21 June 1910.
16	George Arthur Barnes	21 June 1910	Also a racing motorcyclist.
17	Lt. George William Patrick Dawes	26 July 1910	George Dawes was a much decorated Boer War veteran before learning to fly. He served with the Royal Berkshire Regiment and was transferred to the newly formed Royal Flying Corps to command No. 11 Squadron RFC in 1915, before being appointed Officer Commanding RFC in the Balkans, a post he held from 1916 to 1918. Mentioned in dispatches on seven occasions, Dawes was honoured by the Greek and Serbian Governments and awarded the French Croix de Guerre.
18	Alliott Verdon Roe	26 July 1910	Founder of A.V. Roe Aircraft Co. and Saunders-Roe.
19	Arthur Edward George	6 September 1910	Swimmer, figure-skater, cyclist, engineer, racing-driver and pioneer aviator who served in the Second Boer War, World War I and World War II (the last in all three services)
20	Richard Francis Ernest Wickham	20 September 1910	Before joining the RFC in 1915, Wickham spent time giving exhibition flights in the United States and Canada. Died in June 1945 as a Squadron Leader in the Royal Air Force Volunteer Reserve.
21	Francis McClean AFC, FRAeS	20 September 1910	Founding member of Royal Aero Club; named on Eastchurch memorial to Pioneer Aviators.
22	Edward Keith Davies	11 October 1910	First person to fly in India.
23	Maurice Ducrocq	1 November 1910	French aviator who ran a flying school at Brooklands. Among his pupils was John Alcock, famed for the first non-stop Atlantic crossing by air.
24	James George Weir	8 November 1910	Bleriot Monoplane at Hendon. After service with the RFC in the first world went on to establish the Cierva Autogiro Company.
25	Hugh Evelyn Watkins	8 November 1910	Born c1881; qualified on a Howard Wright Biplane at Brooklands 8 November 1910. Engaged to fly the Vickers R.E.P. Monoplane on Douglas Mawson’s Antarctic Expedition. After the crash of the aircraft during a demonstration flight in Australia, in which he was slightly injured, he returned to the UK. The aircraft was shipped to Antarctica for use as a tractor and abandoned there. Its remains were discovered in 2010.
26	Clement Hugh Greswell	15 November 1910	Chief pilot of the flying school opened by Claude Grahame-White in Hendon in 1911.
27	Captain John Duncan Bertie Fulton RFA	15 November 1910	Used a Farman Biplane at Salisbury Plain. He was awarded the third R.Ae.C. Special certificate on 6 December 1911. Later a Lieutenant Colonel and Chief Inspector of the Aeronautical Inspection Department of the Royal Flying Corps when he died 11 November 1915.
28	Leslie F. Macdonald	15 November 1910	Test pilot for Vickers Ltd.; drowned 13 January 1913, together with his passenger Harold England, when his Vickers tractor biplane suffered engine problems and he was forced to ditch in the Thames near Erith.
29	Lt. Richard Talbot Snowden-Smith	15 November 1910	Later Major-General, Director of Supplies and Transport at the War Office. He was the first officer on the Active List to obtain an Aviator's certificate.
30	Horatio Barber	22 November 1910	Used own design, the ASL Valkyrie, at Hendon. In 1911 he flew the world's first cargo flight when he was asked to transport electric light bulbs from Shoreham to Hove. Became a First World War flight instructor with the Royal Flying Corps.
31	Thomas Sopwith	22 November 1910	Founder of Sopwith Aviation Company, and later of Hawker Aircraft; named on Eastchurch memorial to Pioneer Aviators
32	Joseph Joel Hammond	22 November 1910	Flying a Bristol Boxkite at Salisbury Plain. First New Zealand aviator to gain a pilot's certificate. Died in an aircraft accident in Indianapolis, U.S.A. 1918.
33	Sydney Ernest Smith	22 November 1910	At Brooklands on a Bristol biplane, flew with the RFC and RAF during the first world war, later a director of the Bristol Aeroplane Company.
34	Archibald Reith Low	22 November 1910	At Brooklands on a Bristol biplane. Later worked for Vickers as a designer.
35	Robert C. Fenwick	29 November 1910	Killed in the Mersey Monoplane on 13 August 1912 which was deemed unstable by the Accident Investigation Committee.
36	Andrew George Board	29 November 1910	Using a Bleriot monoplane at Hendon he was a Captain in the South Wales Borderers later became an instructor at the Central Flying School. Retired as a Royal Air Force Air Commodore in 1931.
37	Herbert Frederick Wood	29 November 1910	Bristol Biplane at Brooklands. A Major in the 9th Lancers, he became head of the aviation department of Vickers Limited, represented Vickers on the SBAC when it was founded in 1916 and was a member of its Committee of Management. Died in December 1918
38	Cecil Compton Paterson	6 December 1910	A motor engineer he was awarded his certificate in an aircraft built himself, the Paterson Biplane, at Freshfield. Went to South Africa and established a training school for the South African Army. Considered to be the founder of the South African Air Force.

== See also ==
Lists for other years:

- 1910
- 1911
- 1912
- 1913
- 1914
- List of pilots with foreign Aviator's Certificates accredited by the Royal Aero Club 1910-1914

== Bibliography ==
- Barnes C.H. & James D.N (1989). Shorts Aircraft since 1900. London: Putnam. p. 560. ISBN 0-85177-819-4.
