= E. T. Prosser =

British aviator

Edwin T. Prosser (14 April 1895 – unknown) was an early British aviator who was reputed to have flown a Bleriot at the age of 16.

== Life ==
Prosser was born in Wolverhampton. He obtained his Royal Aero Club Aviator's Certificate from Hendon Flying School, London, in June 1913, and became a member of Birmingham Aero Club. Prosser and Mr A. M. Bonehill built a glider of the Chanute type in August 1910. offering towed passenger flights. The glider was destroyed by a gale on 26 August 1911. Prosser flew a 50 hp Caudron biplane over Cwmamman, Wales. The Amman Valley Chronicle reported on 30 October 1913: "Every vantage point was thronged with people watching the first aeroplane flying through the district and, of course, like most other things, it went to Ammanford."

Prosser visited Alcester, Warwickshire, on 8 March 1914. Prosser, flying a 40 ft biplane, was the first-named competitor at the first British longest soaring flight contest, which took place at Itford in 1922 (16–21 October). The Daily Mail provided a prize of £1,000. Prosser later moved to Australia where he trained pilots.
