= Victor Mahl =

English aviator (1889–1915)

- Born: 28 October 1889; Twickenham, Middlesex, England
- Died: 2 April 1915 (aged 25); Southampton, Hampshire, England
- Occupations: Aviator and Engineer
- Known for: Chief Engineer for Sopwith Aviation Company

Victor Mahl (28 October 1889 – 2 April 1915) was an early English aviator and Chief Mechanic of the Sopwith Aviation Company.

Mahl was born in Twickenham in Middlesex, England on 28 October 1889. By 1911 he was a motor engineer and he became the Chief Engineer to the Sopwith Aviation Company. Mahl married Winifred Day in 1912 in Wolverhampton. He worked as Howard Pixton's engineer when he won the 1914 Schneider Trophy.

On 14 May 1914 Mahl obtained his aviators licence flying a Sopwith Biplane at Brooklands. Mahl test flew Sopwith aircraft and on 1 November 1914 he crashed into Southampton Water flying a Sopwith seaplane. The passenger and designer of the aircraft R. Austen was killed but Mahl was rescued from water clinging to one of the upturned floats.

On 2 April 1915 while he was at Southampton testing seaplanes he died after an operation for appendicitis.

== See also ==
- List of pilots awarded an Aviator's Certificate by the Royal Aero Club in 1914
