= List of pilots with foreign Aviator's Certificates accredited by the Royal Aero Club 1910–14 =

The world governing body for air sports and aeronautics and astronautics world records, the Fédération Aéronautique Internationale (FAI), was founded on 14 October 1905. The Royal Aero Club is the authority which administers the above activities for the United Kingdom.

With effect from 1 March 1910, the rules governing the authorisation of Aviators' certificate awarded in another country were as follows: "... Foreigners belonging to a country represented on the F.A.I, can only receive a certificate from the Royal Aero Club of the United Kingdom after having obtained the consent from the national sporting authority approved by the F.A.I. But a certificate may also be granted to a foreigner whose country is not represented on the F.A.I., without further application."

The rules governing the award of Aviators' Certificates, amended with effective from 3 January 1914, were as follows: "The Sporting Authority governing aviation in each country represented on the F.A.I, can alone grant Aviators' Certificates to all candidates, of at least 18 years of age, and coming under its jurisdiction.

1. To candidates of the same nationality as the Club.
2. To foreigners belonging to a country not represented on the F.A.I.
3. To foreigners of a country represented on the F.A.I.; but in this case the certificate can only be delivered with the authorisation of the Sporting Authority of the candidate's country."

== List ==
Note: This list is limited to the given period of time because from 1914 the numbers of pilots increased significantly with the onset of World War I.

Date accredited	Name	Issued by	Issue date	Certificate number	Comment
30 April 1910	Dickson, Capt. Bertram	Aéro-Club de France	5 May 1910	71	Captain Royal Field Artillery, certificate taken on a Farman Biplane on 12 May 1910, died 28 September 1913.
30 April 1910	McArdle, W. D.	Aéro-Club de France	19 April 1910	72	
30 April 1910	Gilmour, Douglas Graham	Aéro-Club de France	19 April 1910	75	Crashed and killed at Richmond, 17 February 1912 due to structural failure of a Martin and Handasyde monoplane he was testing.
30 April 1910	Gibbs, Lieut. Launcelot D. Louis, RFA	Aéro-Club de France	10 June 1910	82	
23 July 1910	Somerset, Somers	Aéro-Club de France	19 July 1910	151	
1 October 1910	Smith, Waldemar William	Aéro-Club de France	19 September 1910	231	
8 October 1910	Hammond, J. J. (NZ)	Aéro-Club de France	4 October 1910	258	Certificate taken on a Sanchez-Besa Biplane on 4 October 1910
15 October 1910	Esterre, Charles Robert d'	Aéro-Club de France	4 October 1910	259	
15 October 1910	Burke, Capt. C. J.	Aéro-Club de France	4 October 1910	260	
5 November 1910	Paul, Edmond A.	Aéro-Club de France	19 October 1910	272	
28 January 1911	Weston, Maximilian John	Aéro-Club de France	3 February 1911	357	Farman school, Etampes. John Weston (aka Maximilian John Ludwick Weston) founded the Aeronautical Society of South Africa in 1911 and the John Weston Aviation Company of South Africa. www.johnwestonaviator.co.uk
28 January 1911	Hamel, Gustav	Aéro-Club de France	3 February 1911	358	
11 February 1911	Woodward, G. E. T.	Aéro-Club de France	3 March 1911	404	
20 January 1912	Wilson, D. Corbett	Aéro-Club de France	18 January 1912	722	
2 March 1912	Hoff, William	Aero Club of America	n.a.	n.a.	
12 March 1912	Grant, James	Aéro-Club de France	March 1912	798	
20 April 1912	Scholefield, Edward Rodolph Clement	Aéro-Club de France	5 April 1912	819	
4 May 1912	Stark, W. M.	Aero Club of America	n.a.	n.a.	
20 April 1912	Buller, Mrs. Winnie	Aéro-Club de France	3 May 1912	848	
6 July 1912	Singh, M. M.	Aero Club of America	n.a.	n.a.	
20 July 1912	Russell, R. B.	Aero Club of America	n.a.	n.a.	
21 September 1912	Beech, Alexander C.	Aero Club of America	n.a.	n.a.	
21 September 1912	Martyn, Lieut. Barry	Aéro-Club de France	21 September 1912	1032	Wiltshire Regiment
16 November 1912	Reid, P. H. (Canada)	Aero Club of America	n.a.	n.a.	
30 November 1912	Unwin, Ernest Frederic	Aéro-Club de France	30 November 1912	1159	
30 November 1912	Voss, Clive Harold	Aéro-Club de France	6 December 1912	1160	
21 December 1912	Mellor, Clive	Aéro-Club de France	26 December 1912	1178	
25 January 1913	Masterman, Edward	Aéro-Club de France	31 January 1913	1210	
25 January 1913	Fuller, Hugh	Aéro-Club de France	31 January 1913	1211	
25 January 1913	Harvey, Edward C.	Aéro-Club de France	31 January 1913	1212	
25 January 1913	Burroughs, J.E.G.	Aéro-Club de France	31 January 1913	1213	
25 January 1913	MacNeill, W.M.	Aéro-Club de France	31 January 1913	1214	
29 March 1913	Boothby, Lieut. F. L. M., RN	Aéro-Club de France	4 April 1913	1258	
5 April 1913	Maitland, Major E. M.	Aéro-Club de France	2 May 1913	1281	
5 April 1913	Reynolds, Charles	Aéro-Club de France	2 May 1913	1282	
31 May 1913	Leith, Frederic	Aéro-Club de France	6 June 1913	1353	
31 May 1913	Leith, George	Aéro-Club de France	6 June 1913	1354	
31 May 1913	Bryan, Lieut. A. Loftus	Aéro-Club de France	6 June 1913	1355	
5 July 1913	Western, Lieut. Bertram C. M.	Aéro-Club de France	4 July 1913	1401	
19 July 1913	Douglas, Stephen	Aéro-Club de France	4 July 1913	1403	
19 July 1913	Freeman, Lieut. Wilfrid Rhodes	Aéro-Club de France	4 July 1913	1404	
2 August 1913	Ford, Archibald	Aéro-Club de France	5 September 1913	1419	
16 August 1913	Conran, Capt. Owen Mostyn	Aéro-Club de France	5 September 1913	1420	
6 September 1913	Carbery, Lord John	Aéro-Club de France	5 September 1913	1437	
13 September 1913	Woodcock, Harold Larpent	Aéro-Club de France	7 November 1913	1475	
13 September 1913	Bass, Ernest C.	Aero Club of America	n.a.	n.a.	Also held a certificate for 'hydro-aeroplane'
4 October 1913	Keating, Henry S.	Aero Club of America	n.a.	n.a.	
18 October 1913	Brown, Lindop E.	Aero Club of America	n.a.	n.a.	
1 November 1913	Madely, James Welby	Aéro-Club de France	7 November 1913	1519	
1 November 1913	Cruikshank, Guy	Aéro-Club de France	7 November 1913	1520	
1 November 1913	Grey, Robin	Aéro-Club de France	7 November 1913	1521	
29 November 1913	Lockwood, M. H.	Aéro-Club de France	19 December 1913	1550	
29 November 1913	Yates, H. A. F.	Aéro-Club de France	19 December 1913	1551	
13 December 1913	Smith-Cumming, Cdr. Mansfield	Aéro-Club de France	19 December 1913	1568	Maurice Farman Biplane, Etampes
24 January 1914	Mansfield, William	Aéro-Club de France	6 February 1914	1595	
24 January 1914	Fry, Lawrence	Aéro-Club de France	6 February 1914	1596	
21 February 1914	Ash, B. Drommond	Aéro-Club de France	6 March 1914	1612	Maurice Farman Biplane, Étampes
7 March 1914	Hearn, Thomas Elder	Aéro-Club de France	10 February 1914	1614	Blériot Monoplane, Blériot School, Buc
21 March 1914	Eyre, Valentine William	Aéro-Club de France	3 April 1914	1618	Blériot Monoplane, Blériot School, Buc
11 April 1914	Webster, H. J.	Aero Club of America	n.a.	n.a.	
15 May 1914	Ross, Thomas Melville	Aero Club of America	13 April 1914	n.a.	Curtiss Biplane, San Diego
15 May 1914	Ricou, Charles	Aéro-Club de France	5 June 1914	1636	Maurice Farman Biplane, Étampes
15 May 1914	Pearce, Capt. James Edward	Aéro-Club de France	5 June 1914	1637	Maurice Farman Biplane, Étampes
19 June 1914	Landry, Jean Marie	Aéro-Club de France	10 July 1914	1659	Canadian; Blériot Monoplane, Buc
14 August 1914	Smith, Charles M.	Aéro-Club de France	10 July 1914	1700	Maurice Farman Biplane, Étampes
14 August 1914	Heathcote, Capt. John Robert Campbell	Aéro-Club de France	10 July 1914	1711	Queen's Own Cameron Highlanders, Maurice Farman Biplane, Étampes
9 October 1914	Brewer, Griffith	Aero Club of America	15 August 1914	307	Wright Biplane, Wright Station, Dayton, Ohio; served the Royal Aero Club in various capacities for many years.
20 November 1914	Netherwood, Lieut. Douglas B.	Aero Club of America	17 August 1914	312	U.S. Army, Curtiss Biplane, North Island, San Diego, California on the 17 August 1914

== See also ==
Lists of pilots awarded an Aviator's Certificate by the Royal Aero Club 1910–1914:

- 1910
- 1911
- 1912
- 1913
- 1914
