= Royal Aero Club =

National co-ordinating body for air sport in the United Kingdom

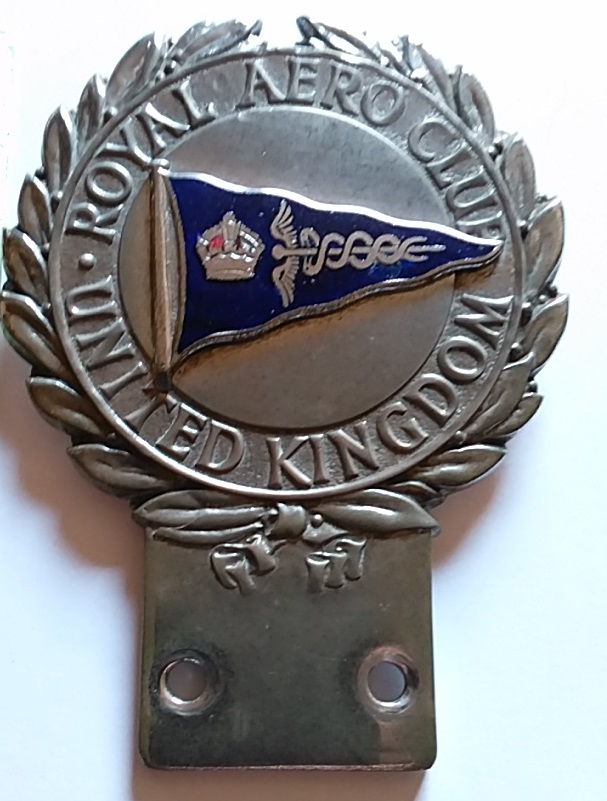
A car badge featuring the emblem of the Royal Aero Club (RAeC) United Kingdom.

The Royal Aero Club (RAeC) is the national co-ordinating body for air sport in the United Kingdom. It was founded in 1901 as the Aero Club of Great Britain, being granted the title of the "Royal Aero Club" in 1910.

== History ==
The Aero Club was founded in 1901 by Frank Hedges Butler, his daughter Vera and Charles Rolls (one of the founders of Rolls-Royce), partly inspired by the Aero Club of France. It was initially concerned more with ballooning but after the demonstrations of heavier-than-air flight made by the Wright brothers in France in 1908, it embraced the aeroplane. The original club constitution declared that it was dedicated to 'the encouragement of aero auto-mobilism and ballooning as a sport.' As founded, it was primarily a London gentlemen's club, but gradually moved on to a more regulatory role. It had a clubhouse at 119 Piccadilly, which it retained until 1961.

The club was granted its Royal prefix on 15 February 1910. From 1910 the club issued Aviator's Certificates, which were internationally recognised under the Fédération Aéronautique Internationale (FAI) to which the club was the UK representative. The club is the governing body in the UK for air sports, as well as for records and competitions.

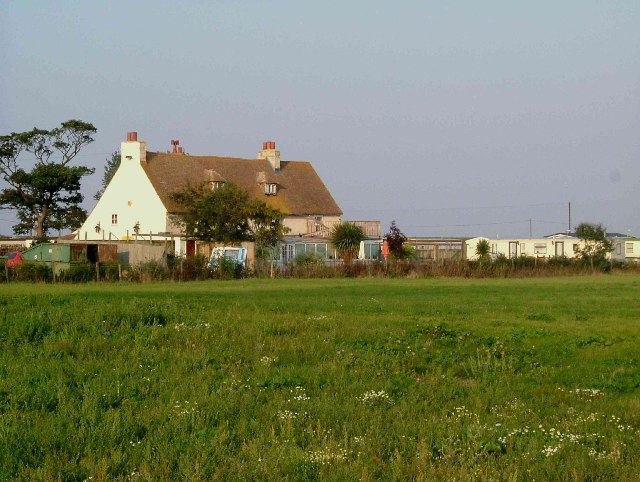
Muswell Manor

The club established its first flying ground on a stretch of marshland at Shellbeach near Leysdown on the Isle of Sheppey in early 1909. A nearby farmhouse, Mussell Manor (now called Muswell Manor) became the flying ground clubhouse, and club members could construct their own sheds to accommodate their aircraft. Among the first occupants of the ground were Short Brothers. Two of the brothers, Eustace and Oswald, had previously made balloons for Aero Club members and been appointed the official engineers of the Aero Club. They had also enlisted their eldest brother, Horace, when they decided to begin constructing heavier-than-air aircraft. They acquired a licence to build copies of the Wright aircraft and set up the first aircraft production line in the world at Leysdown.

On 1 May 1909 John Moore-Brabazon (later Lord Brabazon of Tara) made a flight of 500 yards in his Voisin at Shellbeach. This is officially recognised as the first flight by a British pilot in Britain.

The same week the Wright brothers visited the Aero Club flying ground at Shellbeach. After inspecting the Short Brothers' factory, a photograph was taken outside Mussell Manor of the Wright Brothers with all of the early British aviation pioneers to commemorate their visit to Britain.

In October 1909, the club recognised the Blackpool Aviation Week, making it Britain's first official air show. On 30 October Moore-Brabazon was also the first to cover a mile (closed circuit) in a British aeroplane, flying the Short Biplane No. 2, and so winning a prize of £1,000 offered by the Daily Mail newspaper. On 4 November 1909, he decided to take up a piglet, which he named Icarus the Second, as a passenger, thereby disproving the adage that "pigs can't fly".

It moved the next year to nearby Eastchurch, where the Royal Navy had established a flying school.

Until 1911 the British Military did not have any pilot training facilities. As a result, most early military pilots were trained by members of the club and many became members. By the end of the First World War, more than 6,300 military pilots had taken RAeC Aviator's Certificates.

After the loss of its Piccadilly clubhouse in 1961, the club was lodged at the Lansdowne Club at 9 Fitzmaurice Place until 1968. It then moved for a short spell to the Junior Carlton Club's modern building at 94 Pall Mall. In June 1973 the club merged with the United Service Club and moved into its premises at 116 Pall Mall. All its aviation-related activities were then transferred to the Aviation Council (United Service and Royal Aero Club) Ltd incorporated on 1 February 1973. In June 1975, the United Service and Royal Aero Club merged with the Naval and Military Club and on 1 August 1975 the Royal Aero Club of the United Kingdom was officially launched and endowed with all its awards, library and memorabilia and took the place of the Aviation Council. By 1977, the club had ceased to be a members club but continued to carry out the function previously carried out by its Aviation Council, with the Secretariat based at the Leicester premises of the British Gliding Association.

Today the Royal Aero Club continues to be the national governing and co-ordinating body of air sport and recreational flying. The governing bodies of the various forms of sporting aviation (for example British Aerobatic Association) are all members of the Royal Aero Club, which is the UK governing body for international sporting purposes. The Royal Aero Club also acts to support and protect the rights of recreational pilots in the context of national and international regulation.

== First aviator certificates ==
The following were the first ten people to gain their aviator certificates from the Royal Aero Club:

1. J. T. C. Moore-Brabazon – 8 March 1910
2. C. S. Rolls – 8 March 1910
3. Sir Alfred Rawlinson – 5 April 1910
4. Cecil Stanley Grace – 12 April 1910
5. George Bertram Cockburn – 26 April 1910
6. Claude Grahame-White – 26 April 1910
7. A. Ogilvie – 24 May 1910
8. A. M. Singer – 31 May 1910
9. L. D. L. Gibbs – 7 June 1910
10. S. F. Cody – 14 June 1910: made first aeroplane flight in Britain

The first women to be awarded their aviator certificates from the Royal Aero Club were Hilda Hewlett on 29 August 1911 (certificate No. 122) followed by Cheridah de Beauvoir Stocks (certificate No. 153) on 7 November 1911.

== Air races and awards ==
=== Air races ===
A number of air races were organised by the club:

- The King's Cup
- SBAC Cup
- The Kemsley Trophy
- The Norton-Griffiths Cup
- The Grosvenor Cup
- The Siddeley Trophy
- The Air League Cup

=== Britannia Trophy ===
The Britannia Trophy is presented by the Royal Aero Club for aviators accomplishing the most meritorious performance in aviation during the previous year.

== See also ==
- List of pilots awarded an Aviator's Certificate by the Royal Aero Club in 1910
- List of pilots awarded an Aviator's Certificate by the Royal Aero Club in 1911
- List of pilots awarded an Aviator's Certificate by the Royal Aero Club in 1912
- List of pilots awarded an Aviator's Certificate by the Royal Aero Club in 1913
- List of pilots awarded an Aviator's Certificate by the Royal Aero Club in 1914
- List of pilots with foreign Aviator's Certificates accredited by the Royal Aero Club 1910–1914
