= Bristol Monoplane =

1911 Monoplane

General information
- Type: Experimental Monoplane
- National origin: United Kingdom
- Manufacturer: Bristol Aeroplane Company
- Number built: 2

History
- First flight: 1911

The Bristol Monoplane (sometimes known as the 1911 Monoplane) was the first monoplane designed and built by the British and Colonial Aeroplane Company.

== Design and development ==
The single-seat monoplane was designed in 1911 by George Challenger and Archibald Low and two were built at Filton in February 1911. It used features from both the Bleriot (warping wings) and Antionette (triangular-section fuselage) designs. The Monoplane was powered by a 50 hp Gnome engine with a two-bladed propeller, the landing gear was what later be called conventional landing gear with a tail-skid.

No. 35 was sent to Larkhill for testing before being exhibited at Olympia in March 1911. No. 36 was displayed at St. Petersburg in April 1911. No. 35 was damaged at Larkhill when it failed to take-off and was not repaired.

== Specifications) ==
Data from Bristol Aircraft Since 1910

General characteristics

- Crew: 1
- Length: 31 ft 6 in (9.60 m)
- Wingspan: 6 ft 0 in (33 m)
- Wing area: 215 sq ft (20.0 m^{2})
- Empty weight: 580 lb (263 kg)
- Gross weight: 760 lb (345 kg)
- Powerplant: 1 × Gnome , 50 hp (37 kW)
- Propellers: 2-bladed

Performance

- Maximum speed: 55 mph (89 km/h, 48 kn) estimated
