= Henry Petre =

British aviation pioneer (1884–1962)

Henry Aloysius Petre
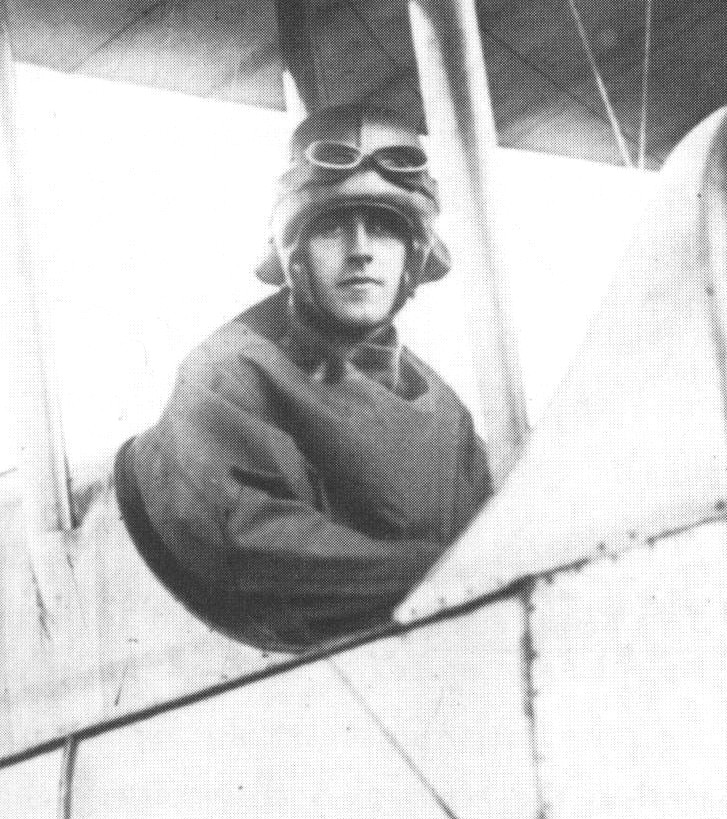
- Henry Petre at Central Flying School, 1914
- Born: 12 June 1884; Ingatestone, Essex, England
- Died: 24 April 1962 (aged 77); London, England
- Relatives: Kay Petre (wife)
- Military career
- Allegiance: Australia; United Kingdom
- Branch: Australian Military Forces; Royal Air Force
- Service years: 1912–19
- Rank: Major
- Nickname: "Peter the Monk"
- Unit: No. 15 Squadron RFC (1917)
- Commands: Central Flying School (1913–15); Mesopotamian Half Flight (1915); No. 30 Squadron RFC (1915–16); No. 5 Squadron AFC (1917–18); No. 75 Squadron RAF (1918–19)
- Conflicts: World War I; Middle Eastern theatre; Mesopotamian campaign; Battle of Es Sinn; Battle of Ctesiphon; Siege of Kut; European theatre
- Awards: Distinguished Service Order; Military Cross; Mentioned in Despatches (4)
- Other work: Solicitor

Henry Aloysius Petre, DSO, MC (12 June 1884 – 24 April 1962) was an English solicitor and aviator. He became Australia's first military aviator and a founding member of the Australian Flying Corps, the predecessor of the Royal Australian Air Force. Born in Essex, Petre forsook his early legal career to pursue an interest in aviation, building his own aeroplane and gaining employment as an aircraft designer and pilot. In 1912, he answered the Australian Defence Department's call for pilots to form an aviation school, and was commissioned as a lieutenant in the Australian Military Forces. The following year, he chose the site of the country's first air base at Point Cook, Victoria, and established its inaugural training institution, the Central Flying School, with Eric Harrison.

Shortly after the outbreak of World War I, Petre was appointed commander of the Mesopotamian Half Flight, the first unit of the newly formed Australian Flying Corps to see active service. He led the Half Flight through the Battles of Es Sinn and Ctesiphon, and the siege of Kut. His actions in the Middle East earned him the Distinguished Service Order, the Military Cross, and four mentions in despatches. Transferring to the Royal Air Force as a major in 1918, he commanded No. 75 Squadron before retiring from the military the following year. Petre resumed his legal practice in England, and continued to fly recreationally until his death in 1962, aged seventy-seven. He was married to racing driver Kay Petre.

== Early career ==
Henry Aloysius Petre (pronounced "Peter") was born on 12 June 1884 at Ingatestone, Essex. He was the son of Sebastian Henry Petre and his wife Catharine, née Sibeth. Descended from the 11th Baron Petre, Henry was schooled at Mount St Mary's College, Chesterfield, before following his father into law and becoming a solicitor in 1905. Impressed by Louis Blériot's pioneering cross-channel flight in July 1909, Petre gave up his legal practice, borrowed £250, and proceeded to build his own aeroplane, with design assistance from his brother Edward, an architect. After spending six months on its construction, Petre crashed the machine on its maiden flight. Uninjured and undiscouraged, he borrowed a further £25, took flying lessons at Brooklands Airfield in Surrey, and obtained Royal Aero Club Aviator's Certificate No. 128 on 12 September 1911. He became an instructor at Brooklands' Deperdussin School, and later its head, before taking up employment as a designer and pilot with Handley Page Limited in 1912. Characterised by official Royal Australian Air Force (RAAF) historian Douglas Gillison as "quiet and academic by nature", and coming from a long line of Catholic clergy, Petre was nicknamed "Peter the Monk". On Christmas Eve 1912, Edward Petre, who was known as "Peter the Painter", was killed in an accident at Marske-by-the-Sea, Yorkshire, while attempting to fly from Brooklands to Edinburgh.

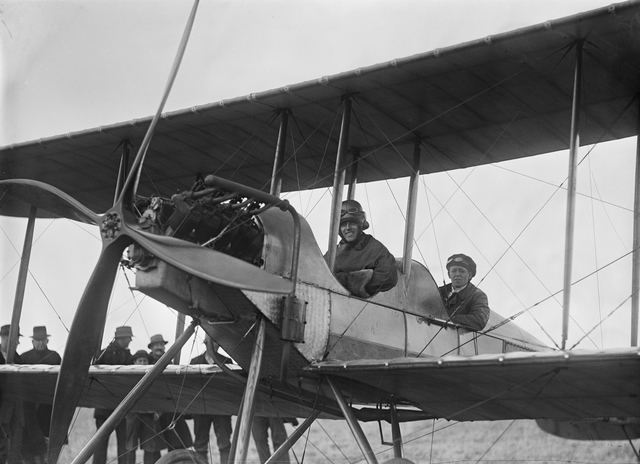
Lieutenants Petre (left) and Harrison (right) in a B.E.2 at Central Flying School, Point Cook, 1914

In December 1911, the Australian Defence Department had advertised in the United Kingdom for "two competent mechanists and aviators" to establish a flying corps and school. From among fifty applications, Petre was chosen and commissioned as a lieutenant in the Australian Military Forces, his appointment on 6 August 1912 making him the nation's first military pilot. The other appointee, Eric Harrison, joined him later that year. Petre arrived in Australia in January 1913, his first task being to choose a site for the proposed Central Flying School (CFS), which he was to command. After travelling hundreds of kilometres on his motorcycle, and rejecting the government's preferred location near the Royal Military College, Duntroon, in Canberra, he selected 297 hectares (730 acres) at Point Cook, Victoria, to become, as George Odgers described it, the "birthplace of Australian military aviation".

Unlike the alternative site near Duntroon, Point Cook was flat, close to the coast and not, in Petre's own words, "isolated in the bush". He and Harrison established the CFS over the following year with four mechanics, three other staff, and five aircraft including two Deperdussin monoplanes, two Royal Aircraft Factory B.E.2 biplanes, and a Bristol Boxkite for initial training. Harrison made the unit's first flight in the Boxkite on Sunday, 1 March 1914. Eight days later Petre registered Australia's first military flying accident when he crashed a Deperdussin while trying to avoid telephone wires during landing; he escaped with bruising but the plane was wrecked. Petre was best man at Harrison's wedding in June. Its coterie of personnel by now being referred to as the Australian Flying Corps, the CFS commenced its first flying course on 17 August 1914, two weeks after the outbreak of World War I. The four students included Captain Thomas White and Lieutenants Richard Williams, George Merz, and David Manwell; Harrison was responsible for initial training and Petre for advanced instruction. Petre was promoted to captain, so that his rank was the same as White's. In October, Petre chaired the first meeting of the Australian Aero Club, held at Point Cook.

== World War I ==
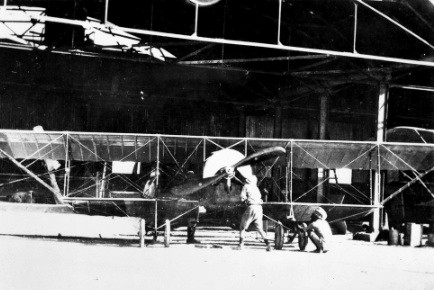
Caudron G.3 of the Mesopotamian Half Flight

On 8 February 1915, the Australian government received a request from the British Government of India for aerial assistance in the campaign against the Turks in Mesopotamia. Sufficient aircrew and supporting personnel were available for only half a flight, so the unit, the AFC's first to see active service, became known as the Mesopotamian Half Flight. Petre was appointed the Half Flight's commanding officer and embarked for Basra via Bombay on 14 April, later to be joined by fellow pilots White, Merz and Lieutenant William Treloar, along with thirty-seven ground staff.

In Mesopotamia, Petre was required to lead the AFC contingent in reconnaissance and sabotage missions, and had to deal with unreliable machines, hazardous terrain, and the threat of incarceration or death at the hands of hostile tribesmen. From 31 May to 4 June 1915, he took part in operations in the Amara area, for which he was mentioned in despatches. The obsolete aircraft supplied by the Indian Government, two Maurice Farman Shorthorns and a Maurice Farman Longhorn, were only capable of top speeds of 50 mph (80 km/h), and the desert wind (known as the shamal) could reach 80 mph (129 km/h), meaning that the aircraft often made no headway or were simply blown backwards. In July, the Half Flight's equipment was augmented by two Caudron G.3 aircraft, a marginal improvement on the Farmans, but still prone to mechanical failure. Later that month, one of the Caudrons was forced to land in enemy territory. Its crew, Merz and William Burn, a New Zealand military officer, were never seen again; they were later reported killed by Arabs after a running gun battle over several miles.

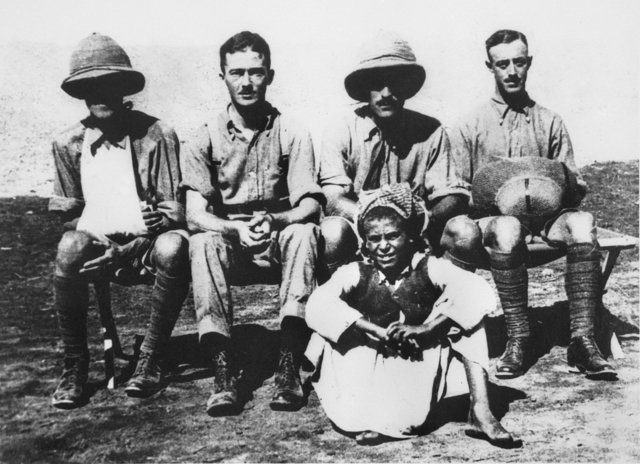
Captain Petre (far left), Captain White (second left) and Lieutenant Merz (far right) of the Mesopotamian Half Flight at Basra, July 1915

On 24 August 1915, the Half Flight was augmented by four Martinsyde S.1s and redesignated No. 30 Squadron, Royal Flying Corps (RFC). The squadron moved into Kut following the city's capture by the Allies during the Battle of Es Sinn in September; for his part in the operation, Petre was again mentioned in despatches. Over the following two months, both Treloar and White were captured and became prisoners of war, leaving Petre as the only pilot remaining from the original Half Flight. Around the time of the Battle of Ctesiphon in November, he devised an implement shaped like a small garden rake that allowed him to accurately measure ground distances from the air to better map the desert terrain. During the siege of Kut between December 1915 and April 1916, he flew a series of missions using crude parachutes to airdrop grain supplies (and a millstone for grinding), medical supplies, and equipment to the town's entrapped garrison, which included nine of his AFC mechanics.

Petre was awarded the Military Cross on 14 January 1916, and was mentioned in despatches twice more over the course of the year. In May 1916 he contracted typhoid and was sent to India for recuperation. He transferred out of No. 30 Squadron in December, and was awarded the Distinguished Service Order the same month. In February 1917, he was posted to France with No. 15 Squadron RFC, a reconnaissance unit operating B.E.2s. Two months later his youngest brother John, a squadron commander in the Royal Naval Air Service and a Distinguished Service Cross recipient, was killed in a flying accident. Petre subsequently returned to England and took charge of No. 5 Squadron AFC (also known as No. 29 Squadron RFC), a training unit for Australian fighter pilots, particularly those destined for Palestine. He had hoped to command No. 1 Squadron AFC in Palestine but received an adverse report concerning his leadership abilities, and the position went to Williams. Petre was discharged from the AFC as a major on 31 January 1918, to take a commission with the RFC. In April that year, he transferred to the newly formed Royal Air Force, establishing and commanding No. 75 (Home Defence) Squadron.

== Later life and legacy ==
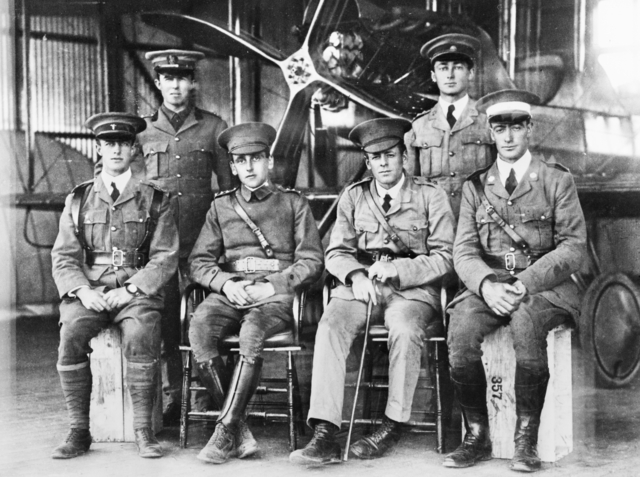
Instructors and students of the first CFS course at Point Cook in 1914: Richard Williams and Thomas White (back row); George Merz, Henry Petre, Eric Harrison, and David Manwell (front row)

Petre retired from the RAF on 15 September 1919, and resumed practice as a solicitor in London. He married Kathleen Defries, a Canadian, in 1929. Petre introduced Kathleen to racing cars and, as Kay Petre, she became one of Britain's leading female drivers of the 1930s. Henry Petre maintained his interest in aviation for the rest of his life, taking up competitive gliding and, according to historian Alan Stephens, more than thirty years after his first flight in 1911 still enjoyed "taking an Auster for a spin". Petre broke the British Gliding Duration Record in 1931, with a time of almost three-and-a-half hours, and served as gliding instructor with the Air Training Corps between 1943 and 1948. In 1951, he received the Royal Aero Club's Silver Medal for his long record of active flying. He visited Australia for the first time in forty-five years in 1961, and was photographed sitting in the cockpit of the same Deperdussin—by then an exhibit at the RAAF Museum—that he had flown at Point Cook in 1914. Having retired from his legal practice in 1958, Petre died in London on 24 April 1962, and was survived by Kay, who died in 1994. The couple had no children.

In a retrospective on the RAAF in November 1939, Flight magazine described Henry Petre and Eric Harrison as "the fathers of military aviation in Australia". Petre's obituary in The Times called him "an air pioneer who founded the Australian Flying Corps". Though Harrison, through his longer association with Australian service flying as a founding member of the Royal Australian Air Force in 1921 and his career up until the end of World War II, was generally regarded as the "Father of the RAAF" until Air Marshal Richard Williams assumed that mantle, Douglas Gillison considered Petre "equally entitled" to such an accolade. In his volume on the Air Force for The Australian Centenary History of Defence in 2001, Alan Stephens noted that Petre made "the greater contribution to the establishment of Point Cook and the Central Flying School", concluding that "perhaps any judgement would not only be moot but also gratuitous, as by circumstance and achievement both men properly belong in the pantheon of the RAAF".
