= Eric Harrison (RAAF officer) =

Australian pilot (1886–1945)

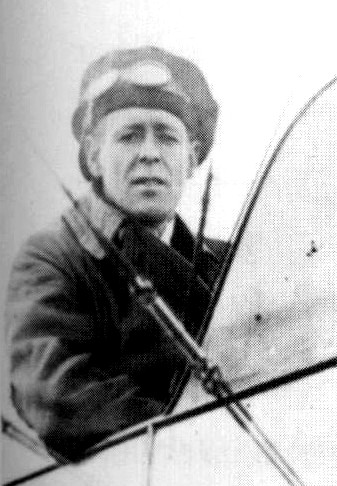
- Harrison at the Central Flying School, Point Cook, 1914
- Born: 10 August 1886; Castlemaine, Victoria
- Died: 5 September 1945 (aged 59); Melbourne
- Military career
- Allegiance: Australia
- Branch: Australian Military Forces; Royal Australian Air Force
- Service years: 1912–1945
- Rank: Group Captain
- Commands: Central Flying School (1917‍–‍18); Aeronautical Inspection Directorate (1928‍–‍45)
- Conflicts: World War I; World War II

Eric Harrison (10 August 1886 – 5 September 1945) was an Australian aviator who made the country's first military flight, and helped lay the foundations of the Royal Australian Air Force (RAAF).

Born in Victoria, Harrison was a flying instructor in Britain when, in 1912, he answered the Australian Defence Department's call for pilots to form an aviation school. Along with Henry Petre, he established Australia's first air base at Point Cook, Victoria, and its inaugural training unit, the Central Flying School (CFS), before making his historic flight in March 1914. Following the outbreak of World War I, when Petre went on active service with the Mesopotamian Half Flight, Harrison took charge of instructing student pilots of the Australian Flying Corps at CFS, and maintaining its fleet of obsolescent aircraft.

Harrison transferred to the RAAF as one of its founding members in 1921, and spent much of the inter-war period in technical services and air accident investigation. Promoted to group captain in 1935, he retired from the Air Force five years later when his post of Director of Aeronautical Inspection was transferred to the public service. He continued to serve in the same capacity as a civilian until his sudden death from a stroke at the age of fifty-nine, just after the end of World War II. Harrison's technical abilities and association with military flying from its earliest days in Australia earned him the title of "Father of the RAAF" for many years, until the mantle was assumed by Air Marshal Sir Richard Williams.

== Early career ==
Born on 10 August 1886 at Clinkers Hill near Castlemaine, Victoria, Eric Harrison was the son of printer and stationer Joseph Harrison, and his English wife Ann Ingamels. He attended Castlemaine Grammar School before starting work as a motor mechanic. Keen to fly from the first time he saw an aeroplane, he travelled to Britain in March 1911 and trained as a pilot at the Bristol School on Salisbury Plain. Six months later, having accumulated some thirty minutes' flight time, he qualified for his Royal Aero Club Aviator's Certificate, becoming only the third Australian to do so. Gaining employment as an instructor for Bristol, he taught flying on behalf of the company in Spain and Italy, as well as in Halberstadt, Germany, where he became aware first-hand of that country's militarism; some of the students he trained and examined later served as pilots in the Luftstreitkräfte during World War I.

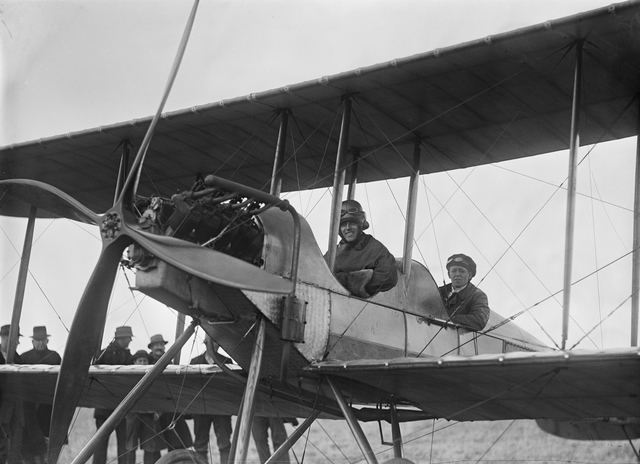
Lieutenants Petre (left) and Harrison (right) in a B.E.2 at the Central Flying School, Point Cook, 1914

In December 1911, the Australian Defence Department advertised in Britain for "two competent mechanists and aviators" to establish a flying corps and training school in Australia. The English-born Henry Petre, a former solicitor employed by Handley Page, and Harry Busteed, an Australian who was Bristol's chief test pilot, successfully applied. Petre was commissioned with the honorary rank of lieutenant in the Australian Military Forces (AMF) on 6 August 1912, but Busteed withdrew his application in October. Harrison took Busteed's place, gaining his commission as an honorary lieutenant on 16 December. Though his new salary of £400 was little improvement on what he was earning in Britain, Harrison was happy to have an excuse to return home.

Petre selected Point Cook, Victoria, to become the site for the AMF's proposed Central Flying School (CFS) in March 1913; meanwhile Harrison remained in Britain temporarily, ordering the facility's complement of aircraft including two Deperdussin monoplanes, two Royal Aircraft Factory B.E.2 biplanes, and a Bristol Boxkite for initial training. Harrison oversaw the construction of the aircraft and their testing, personally flying each one. He subsequently departed Britain aboard RMS Otway and arrived in Western Australia on 27 May. Over the following months, Petre and Harrison planned the development of the Point Cook airfield and established CFS with themselves as instructors, augmented by four mechanics and three other staff. Harrison made Australia's first military flight in the Boxkite on Sunday, 1 March 1914, followed later that day by another in the same aircraft with Petre as passenger and then a third by himself in a Deperdussin. News of these flights was only released on 3 March and a first official flight, with the Chief of the General Staff, Brigadier Josef Gordon as passenger, was scheduled for two days later. Petre believed conditions on 5 March were too windy but Gordon pressed for the flight to go ahead, and Harrison took him in the Boxkite. The wind, along with the aeroplane's low power and the weight of its passengers, almost led to the Boxkite crashing on take-off and prevented it gaining more than 30 feet (9 m) in altitude before Harrison terminated the flight. Petre crashed a Deperdussin on 9 March and a concerned Minister for Defence, Edward Millen, made a surprise visit to Point Cook two days later to inspect the wreckage. Harrison helped mollify Millen with a display in the Boxkite, followed by a short flight with the minister's daughter, Ruby, as passenger. On 29 June, Harrison married Kathleen Prendergast, daughter of the future Premier of Victoria, George Prendergast, at St Mary's Catholic Church in West Melbourne.

== World War I ==
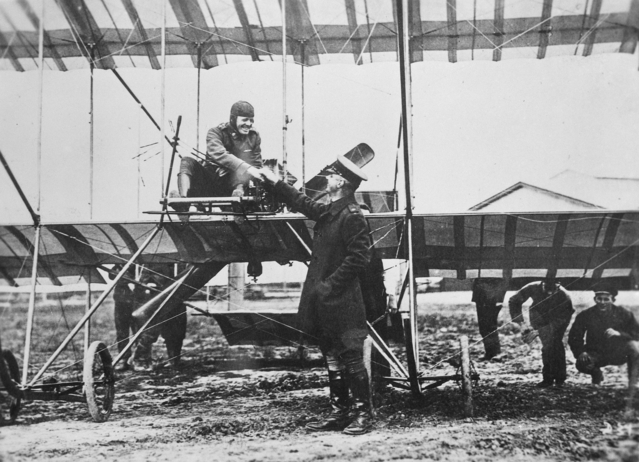
Harrison (left) in a Bristol Boxkite, greeted by Lieutenant Colonel Reynolds, first commanding officer of No. 1 Squadron AFC, at Point Cook, c. 1916

Its coterie of personnel by now being referred to as the Australian Flying Corps (AFC), CFS commenced its first course on 17 August 1914, two weeks after the outbreak of World War I. The students included Captain Thomas White and Lieutenant Richard Williams. Harrison provided initial training to solo level and Petre advanced instruction. In November, Harrison was given command of a flying unit to support the Australian Naval and Military Expeditionary Force in German New Guinea. The unit's aircraft consisted of a B.E.2 and a Farman seaplane, which were crated and despatched via rail and then troopship to Madang. With little in the way of enemy resistance the aircraft were never assembled in New Guinea and Harrison had to return in January 1915 without leading the first Australian airmen into combat, a distinction that instead went to Petre as commander of the Mesopotamian Half Flight later that year. The New Guinea expedition was not publicised until it was over, Harrison's cover story for his time away from Point Cook being a honeymoon with his new wife.

Harrison was promoted to honorary captain on 1 April 1915. With Petre on active duty, Harrison took on the main responsibility for providing basic flying training to the pilots of the first three squadrons to be formed in Australia for overseas service. Many of his students went on to play a prominent role in the future Royal Australian Air Force (RAAF), including Bill Anderson, Harry Cobby, Adrian Cole, Frank McNamara, Lawrence Wackett, and Henry Wrigley. Having graduated twenty-four new pilots by the end of 1915, Harrison was able to establish the first AFC squadron, designated No. 67 (Australian) Squadron, Royal Flying Corps; it was commonly known as No. 1 Squadron AFC from its inception, and officially so from 1 January 1918. The unit departed for Egypt in March 1916 under the command of Lieutenant Colonel Edgar Reynolds. Nos. 3 and 4 Squadrons AFC were formed at Point Cook in late 1916 to operate in France following advanced training in England.

Augmenting his instructional and administrative duties, Harrison put his mechanical abilities to use initiating the building of aero engines in Australia and maintaining CFS's complement of airframes; according to Wackett, only Harrison had the skill to keep the obsolescent machines in the air. He was appointed officer-in-charge of CFS in June 1917 with the rank of temporary major; the rank became substantive on 9 September 1918. That month, CFS became part of the Australian Imperial Force, helping to facilitate exchange between AFC staff in Australia and overseas. Harrison handed over command of CFS to Major William Sheldon, former commanding officer of Nos. 2 and 4 Squadrons.

== Interbellum and World War II ==
Harrison began a long association with engineering and air safety when he was posted to Britain for secondment to the Aeronautical Inspection Directorate towards the end of World War I, departing Australia on 22 October 1918 and returning on 9 January 1920. He transferred as a flight lieutenant (honorary squadron leader) to the newly formed Australian Air Force on 31 March 1921, becoming one of its twenty-one founding officers; the adjective "Royal" was added to the service's name in August that year. His initial appointment was as Officer Commanding Motor Transport Repair Section, No. 1 Aircraft Depot. Dissatisfied with his RAAF rank considering his leading position in the pre-war Central Flying School, Harrison appealed for greater seniority. As a result, he was appointed Air Liaison Officer to the Air Ministry in London, with promotion to the substantive rank of squadron leader, on 1 July. Returning to Australia on 22 February 1927, he was appointed Assistant Director of Technical Services on 3 March, and in May helped form Australia's Air Accident Investigation Committee (AAIC). On 12 March 1928 he became RAAF Director of Aeronautical Inspection, receiving promotion to wing commander on 1 July. Harrison's position took him throughout the country, inspecting equipment and investigating the causes of air crashes. Among the accidents he investigated were the disappearance of the Southern Cloud in March 1931, the loss of two de Havilland DH.86s in a matter of weeks in 1934, and the crash of an Airlines of Australia Stinson in February 1937. Although the Southern Cloud and DH.86 inquiries were public, AAIC inquiries were generally held in camera, a practice Harrison defended to the media on the grounds that witnesses were more forthcoming in private.

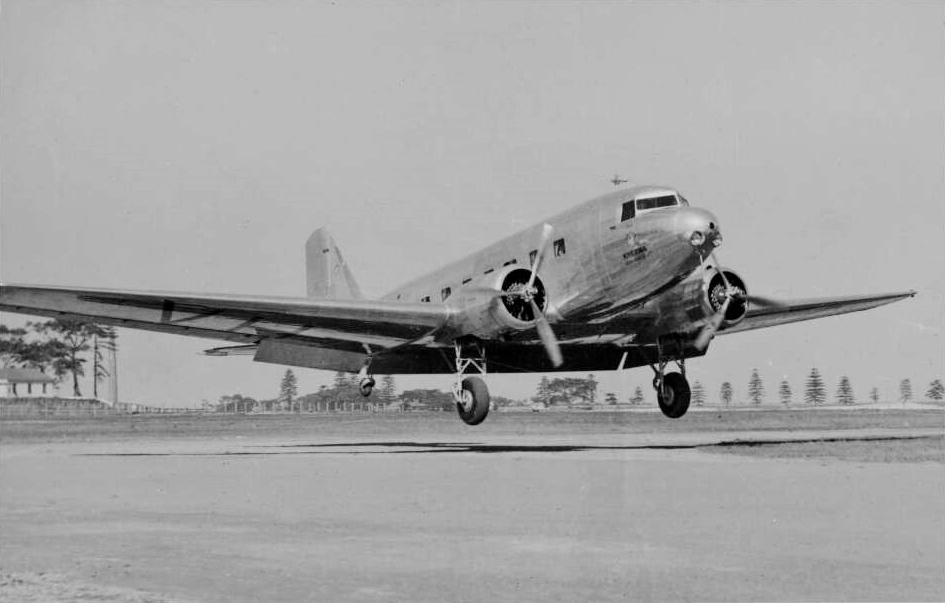
DC-2 airliner Kyeema; Harrison was a member of the court of inquiry into its crash on 25 October 1938.

Promoted to group captain on 1 January 1935, Harrison took charge of the Australian government's resources committee for aircraft, aero engines, and motor transport, one of several subcommittees on the Defence Resources Board set up to investigate and report on the readiness of Australian industry to provide munitions for defence in the event of international conflict. He was one of the recipients of the King's Jubilee Medal, announced on 6 May. In 1937, Harrison travelled to Britain and the United States for further study of accident investigation methods, as well as aircraft production. He was a member of the court of inquiry into the crash on 25 October 1938 of the Douglas DC-2 airliner Kyeema, which overshot Essendon airport in low cloud, killing all fourteen passengers and four crew members. The inquiry's report singled out Major Melville Langslow, Finance Member on both the Civil Aviation Board and the RAAF Air Board, for criticism over cost-cutting measures that had held up trials of safety beacons designed for such eventualities. According to Air Force historian Chris Coulthard-Clark, when Langslow was appointed Secretary at the Department of Air in November the following year, he went out of his way to "make life difficult" for Harrison, causing "bitterness and friction within the department", and prompting the Chief of the Air Staff, Air Vice Marshal Stanley Goble, to take steps to shield the inspector from the new Secretary's ire.

Harrison held the position of Director of Aeronautical Inspection throughout World War II, his staff totalling more than 1,200 by 1945. The number of inspectors increased significantly as local Bristol Beaufort production got under way, and inspection areas were established in mainland capital cities. A reorganisation of the directorate along public service lines in 1940 permitted qualified civilian engineers to be recruited for work that required increasing technical expertise, without them having to join the Air Force. Harrison retired from the RAAF on 12 April with the rank of group captain and permission to continue wearing his service uniform. The following day he was reappointed Director of Aeronautical Inspection under the Department of Air. In July, Harrison proposed the construction of a series of test houses to help decentralise chemical, mechanical and metrological testing of materials used in the manufacture of munitions that previously had to go through either the Munitions Supply Laboratories or the National Standards Laboratory. The result was a major improvement in the speed of testing and, according to the official history of Australia in the war, "a fuller use of the country's scientific and technical manpower". Harrison's wife Kathleen was President of the Air Force Auxiliaries Committee during the war, overseeing welfare organisations that assisted RAAF personnel and their families, and members of the Women's Auxiliary Australian Air Force (WAAAF). Their daughter and only child, Greta, joined the WAAAF and by the end of the war was ranked flight officer.

== Legacy ==
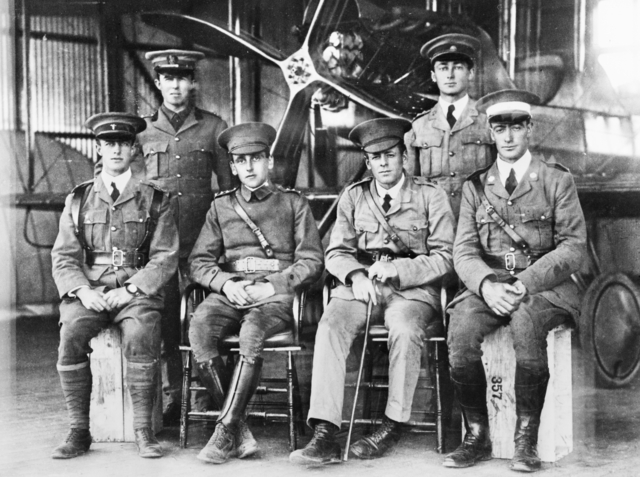
Instructors and students of the first CFS course at Point Cook in 1914: Richard Williams and Thomas White (back row); George Merz, Henry Petre, Eric Harrison, and David Manwell (front row)

On 5 September 1945, soon after the war ended, Harrison died suddenly of hypertensive cerebrovascular disease at his home in the Melbourne suburb of Brighton. He was survived by his wife and daughter, and was cremated. The Minister for Air, Arthur Drakeford, commented that "all members of the service, and, indeed, all Australians interested in aviation, must feel his loss as the snapping of one of the last links with the pioneer days of flying".

One of the original Deperdussins that Harrison ordered and helped assemble in 1914 for the Central Flying School later went on display at the Australian War Memorial in Canberra. On 1 March 2014, as part of the Australian Centenary of Military Aviation Air Show at Point Cook, a replica Boxkite took to the air in a re-enactment of Harrison's historic first flight at the airfield.

Despite his accomplishments in overseeing the training of every student pilot who served in the Australian Flying Corps during World War I, Harrison received no decorations or other official recognition, prompting Group Captain Mark Lax, at the 1999 RAAF History Conference, to describe him as "perhaps the unluckiest of the entire AFC ... an unsung hero". Lax added that, as an instructor, Harrison's "caring, personal approach resulted in a fatality free run with high percentage graduation – surely a remarkable achievement for the time".

Until the title eventually settled on Air Marshal Sir Richard Williams, Harrison was generally considered to be the "Father of the RAAF". His technical expertise, long association with Australian military aviation as a founder member of the AFC and the RAAF, and stronger personality tended to overshadow the part played by Henry Petre, whom historian Douglas Gillison considered "equally entitled" to such an accolade. Reviewing the contributions of Petre and Harrison in his volume of The Australian Centenary History of Defence in 2001, Alan Stephens concluded that "perhaps any judgement would not only be moot but also gratuitous, as by circumstance and achievement both men properly belong in the pantheon of the RAAF".
