= Central Flying School RAAF =

- Central Flying School's crest
- Active: 1913–19; 1940–current
- Country: Australia
- Branch: Royal Australian Air Force
- Role: Flying instructor training
- Part of: Air Training Wing
- Garrison/HQ: RAAF Base East Sale
- Motto(s): Qui Docet Discit ("He who teaches learns")
- Aircraft: Pilatus PC-21

Commanders
- Notable commanders: Henry Petre (1913–15); Eric Harrison (1915–18); Charles Read (1952–54)

Insignia
- Callsign: Aladdin

Central Flying School (CFS) is a Royal Australian Air Force (RAAF) training unit, located at RAAF Base East Sale, Victoria. It operates the Pilatus PC-21 turboprop trainer. The school is responsible for training flight instructors, setting flying standards, and auditing flying practices. It is also home to the Roulettes aerobatic team. CFS was the first military aviation unit to be formed in Australia, in 1913, when its role was to provide basic flying training. Its current form dates from World War II, when it was re-established to train flying instructors for the Empire Air Training Scheme (EATS).

CFS was inaugurated at Point Cook, Victoria, in March 1913, and trained over 150 pilots of the Australian Flying Corps during World War I. It was disbanded in December 1919, and the newly formed RAAF's No. 1 Flying Training School took on its function in 1921. Re-formed under EATS at Point Cook in April 1940, CFS relocated to New South Wales the following month, based first at Camden, then at Tamworth from April 1942, and finally at Parkes from January 1944. It returned to Point Cook in September 1944. By the end of World War II, the school had produced more than 3,600 instructors. It transferred to East Sale in November 1947.

Since 1962, CFS has been responsible for three aerobatic display teams. The first, "The Red Sales", flew De Havilland Vampire jet aircraft. A second team, "The Telstars", was formed in 1963, also flying Vampires. The Telstars disbanded in 1968, just after taking delivery of new Macchi MB326H jets, when the RAAF curtailed display flying. The Roulettes formed in 1970, flying the Macchi, and continued to operate the type until 1990, when the team finished converting to the PC-9. As well as the Roulettes, CFS is responsible for the display work of the Air Force Balloons.

== History ==
=== Origins and World War I ===
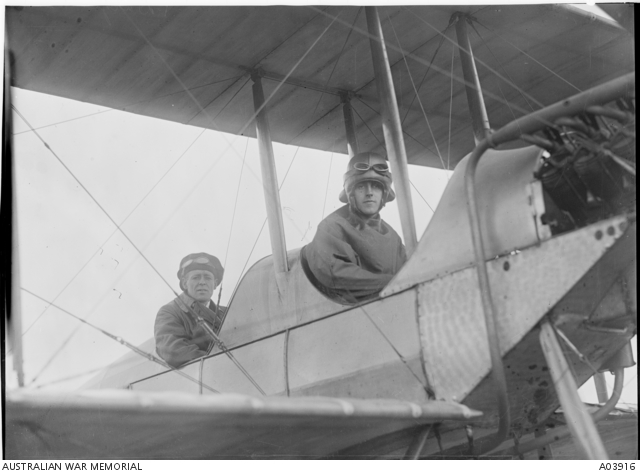
Lieutenants Harrison (left) and Petre (right) in a B.E.2 at Central Flying School, Point Cook, 1914

In December 1911, the Australian Department of Defence advertised in the United Kingdom for "two competent mechanists and aviators" to establish a flying corps and school. The following year, Henry Petre, an Englishman, and Eric Harrison, an Australian, were selected and commissioned as lieutenants in the Australian Military Forces. Petre arrived in Australia in January 1913; his first job was to choose a site for the proposed Central Flying School (CFS), which he was to command. Rejecting the government's preferred location near the Royal Military College, Duntroon, in Canberra, he selected 297 hectares at Point Cook, Victoria, to become, as George Odgers described it, the "birthplace of Australian military aviation". Petre and Harrison established CFS over the following year with four mechanics, three other staff, and five aircraft including two Deperdussin monoplanes, two Royal Aircraft Factory B.E.2 biplanes, and a Bristol Boxkite for initial training. Harrison made the unit's first flight in the Boxkite on 1 March 1914, while Petre, flying a Deperdussin later that day, registered its first accident when he crashed after snaring his tailplane in telephone wires. Its coterie of personnel by now referred to as the Australian Flying Corps (AFC), CFS commenced its first flying course on 17 August 1914, two weeks after the outbreak of World War I. The four students included Captain Thomas White and Lieutenants Richard Williams, George Merz, and David Manwell. Williams, who became the first to graduate, recalled the school as a "ragtime show" consisting of a paddock, tents, and one large structure: a shed for the Boxkite.

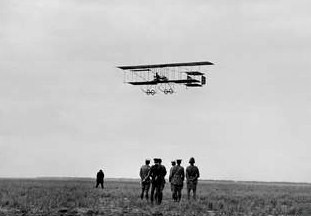
Bristol Boxkite over Point Cook, c. March 1916

A further eleven courses were run during the war years, graduating 152 pilots to a basic flying standard. Many of these students would go on to play a prominent role in the future Royal Australian Air Force (RAAF), including Bill Anderson, Harry Cobby, Adrian Cole, Frank McNamara, Lawrence Wackett, and Henry Wrigley. The AFC's first unit to see active service, the Mesopotamian Half Flight, was raised under Petre's command and departed for the Middle East in April 1915; Petre's fellow pilots included CFS graduates White and Merz. Harrison took over the school's leadership in Petre's absence. The facilities were improved, and by the end of 1915, according to Wackett, they boasted "a good engineering workshop", "cottages for the married staff" and "a very comfortable officers mess". A year later, three AFC squadrons had been formed at Point Cook for service in the Middle East and France: Nos. 1, 3 and 4 Squadrons. In September 1918 the school, now made up of No. 1 Home Training Squadron, No. 1 Home Training Depot, and an aircraft repair section, became part of the Australian Imperial Force. Harrison was posted overseas in October and Major William Sheldon, former commanding officer of Nos. 2 and 4 Squadrons, was placed in charge of CFS. Little training took place in the year following the November 1918 Armistice; staff mainly did "odd jobs" such as making survey flights and promoting government bonds. CFS's units were disbanded in December 1919 and the school taken over by the short-lived Australian Air Corps, formed on 1 January 1920. In 1921, CFS's function was assumed by No. 1 Flying Training School (No. 1 FTS), a unit of the newly formed RAAF.

=== World War II ===
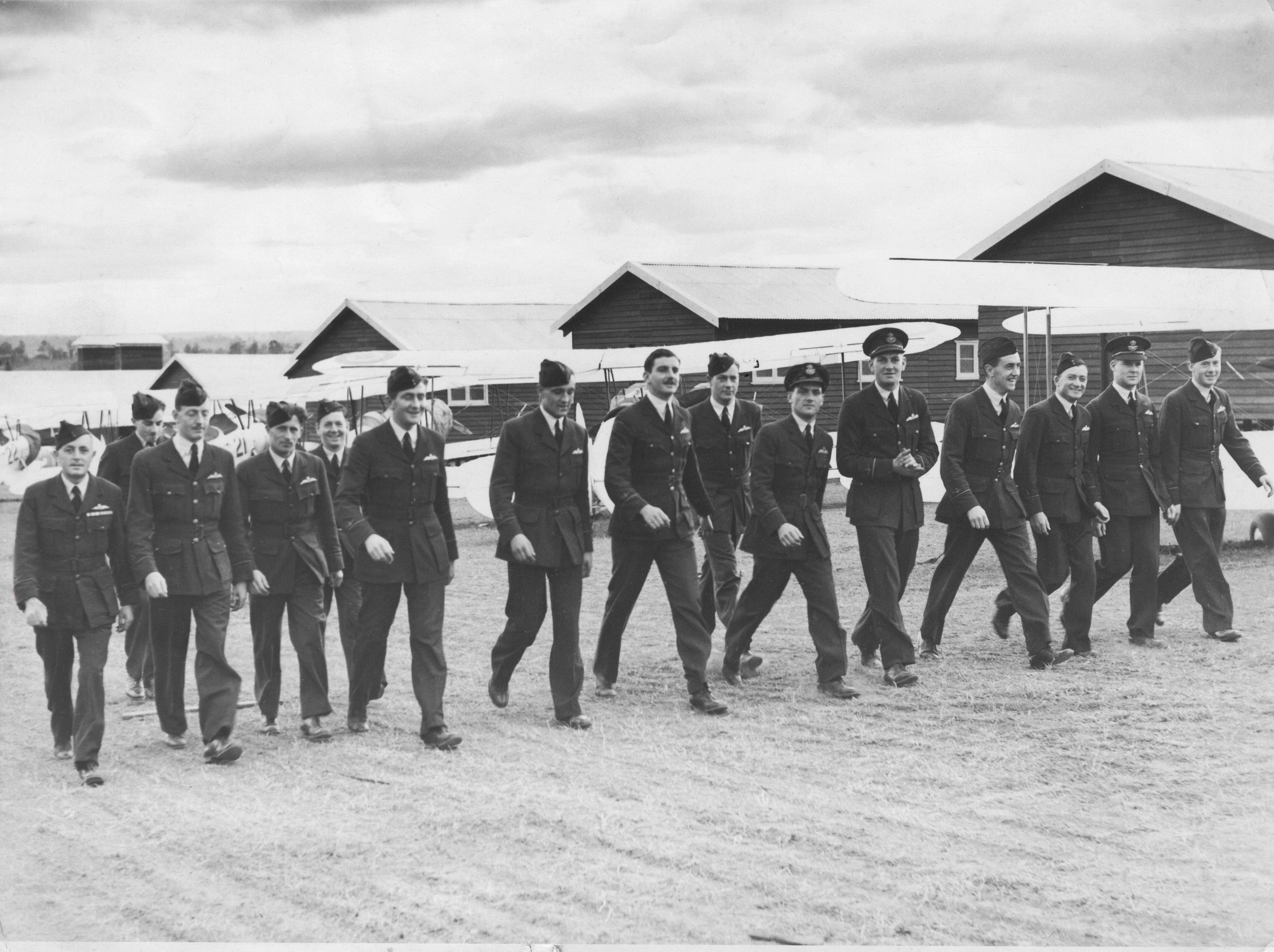
Central Flying School staff, shortly after the unit arrived at RAAF Station Camden, May 1940. Pictured include Flight Lieutenant (later Air Vice Marshal) B.A. Eaton (fourth from left) and Flying Officer I.F. Rose (centre, capless), commanding officer of the school in 1946–48.

RAAF flying training was heavily reorganised soon after the outbreak of World War II in response to Australia's participation in the Empire Air Training Scheme (EATS). Elementary Flying Training Schools were formed, to provide basic flight instruction to cadets, while more advanced pilot instruction was to take place at Service Flying Training Schools. The most pressing need, however, was for flying instructors; the RAAF had only sixteen, and at least 1,000 were needed to meet Australia's obligations under EATS. To train these instructors, the Instructors' Training Squadron at No. 1 FTS was detached to form the nucleus of a new Central Flying School on 29 April 1940. Described as the "nerve-centre of the Empire Air Training Scheme in Australia", it was commanded by Squadron Leader E.C. Bates, RAF, former chief flying instructor at No. 1 FTS. CFS relocated from Point Cook to RAAF Station Camden, New South Wales, on 14 May.

Formerly the privately owned Macquarie Grove Aerodrome, Camden was a new air base, and the school's facilities cost £53,000 to construct. On establishment, its personnel numbered 470 officers and airmen, and its complement of aircraft included twenty-three Tiger Moths, nine CAC Wirraways, and fourteen Avro Ansons. Among the staff were former civil pilots and instructors, as well as career Air Force officers. Graduates from Camden included Bill Newton, later awarded the Victoria Cross for bombing raids in New Guinea, and Jerry Pentland, a World War I fighter ace with twenty-three victories, who went on to become perhaps the oldest RAAF pilot on active duty. The outbreak of the Pacific War led to an influx of United States Army Air Forces units to Australian bases, including Camden. To make way, CFS moved to Tamworth, New South Wales, during March and April 1942. Tamworth was not considered a suitable airfield for the school's Wirraways, Ansons and Airspeed Oxfords, and a further relocation was deemed necessary, this time to RAAF Station Parkes, New South Wales, on 18 January 1944. Later that year, CFS moved once more, returning on 19 September to Point Cook. There it gained an aviation medicine section, which in 1956 was detached to form the RAAF School of Aviation Medicine (later the RAAF Institute of Aviation Medicine). CFS remained at Point Cook for the rest of the war, by which time it had graduated some 3,600 instructors.

=== Post-war era ===
Inspection of Australian-built Lincoln at CFS, 1946

The immediate aftermath of the Pacific War saw large-sale demobilisation of RAAF personnel, along with the disposal of equipment and disbandment of units. CFS was allocated resources to ensure the maintenance of Air Force flying standards, but took on no new students. The school relocated from Point Cook to RAAF Station East Sale (now RAAF Base East Sale), Victoria, during November and December 1947; its aircraft included seven Tiger Moths, nine Wirraways, three Oxfords, two C-47 Dakotas, one P-51 Mustang, and one Avro Lincoln. It then returned to the job of training instructors, graduating its first post-war course in June 1948. Newspapers reporting on its move to East Sale called CFS the RAAF's "university of the air". Official RAAF historian Alan Stephens described the school as "the Air Force's most important peacetime unit", going on to state that "CFS's pre-eminence derived from its role as the Air Force's arbiter of pure flying standards, a responsibility it met by training instructors, examining and rating squadron instructors, conducting quality control tests at flying training schools, and auditing flying practices generally across the RAAF. Any fall in standards at CFS could in time be expected adversely to affect standards across the entire Air Force." Conversely, Stephens continued, the professionalism inculcated at the school flowed through to all flying units. By 1951, the average student taking the six-month instructors' course was reported as being a flight lieutenant aged twenty-seven, with 1,000 hours flying experience. Wing Commander Charles Read, who later became Chief of the Air Staff, served as commanding officer of CFS from August 1952 to May 1954. In May 1953, the school commenced jet instructor training with dual-control De Havilland Vampires. The CAC Winjeel entered service in 1955, to replace the Tiger Moth as the Air Force's basic trainer, and began operating at CFS the following year. In March 1957, the school took on the responsibility of training the RAAF's air traffic controllers; this continued until May 1981, when the RAAF School of Air Traffic Control was formed as an autonomous unit at East Sale.

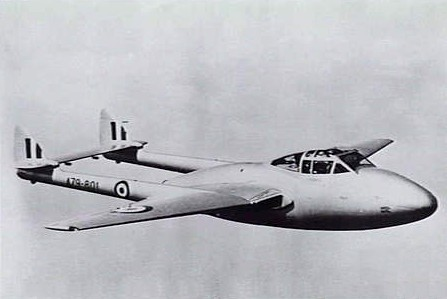
Vampire trainer, 1950s

CFS formed its first aerobatic team, called "The Red Sales", in 1962. The team consisted of four instructors flying Vampire trainers. On 15 August, they were practising a low-level routine when they flew into a hill at 500 miles per hour (800 km/h), killing all four pilots and two passengers. Determined to overcome the shock of the accident, the commanding officer of CFS, Wing Commander Herb Plenty, quickly formed a new aerobatic team called "The Telstars", led by himself. Also flying Vampires, the team made its first public display in February 1963, six months after the Red Sales disaster. In 1965, Plenty's successor as commanding officer, Wing Commander T.J.T. Meldrum, joined an RAAF team charged with selecting a jet trainer to replace both the Winjeel and the Vampire. Led by Air Commodore Brian Eaton, the team chose the Italian Macchi MB-326H as it met all requirements, could be licence-built by the Commonwealth Aircraft Corporation in Australia, and was relatively inexpensive. The Telstars began flying the Macchi in February 1968, but the RAAF cut back on display flying shortly afterwards, and the team disbanded in April. A new aerobatic team flying Macchis, the "Roulettes", was formed at CFS in August 1970, in preparation for the RAAF's fiftieth anniversary celebrations commencing in March 1971.

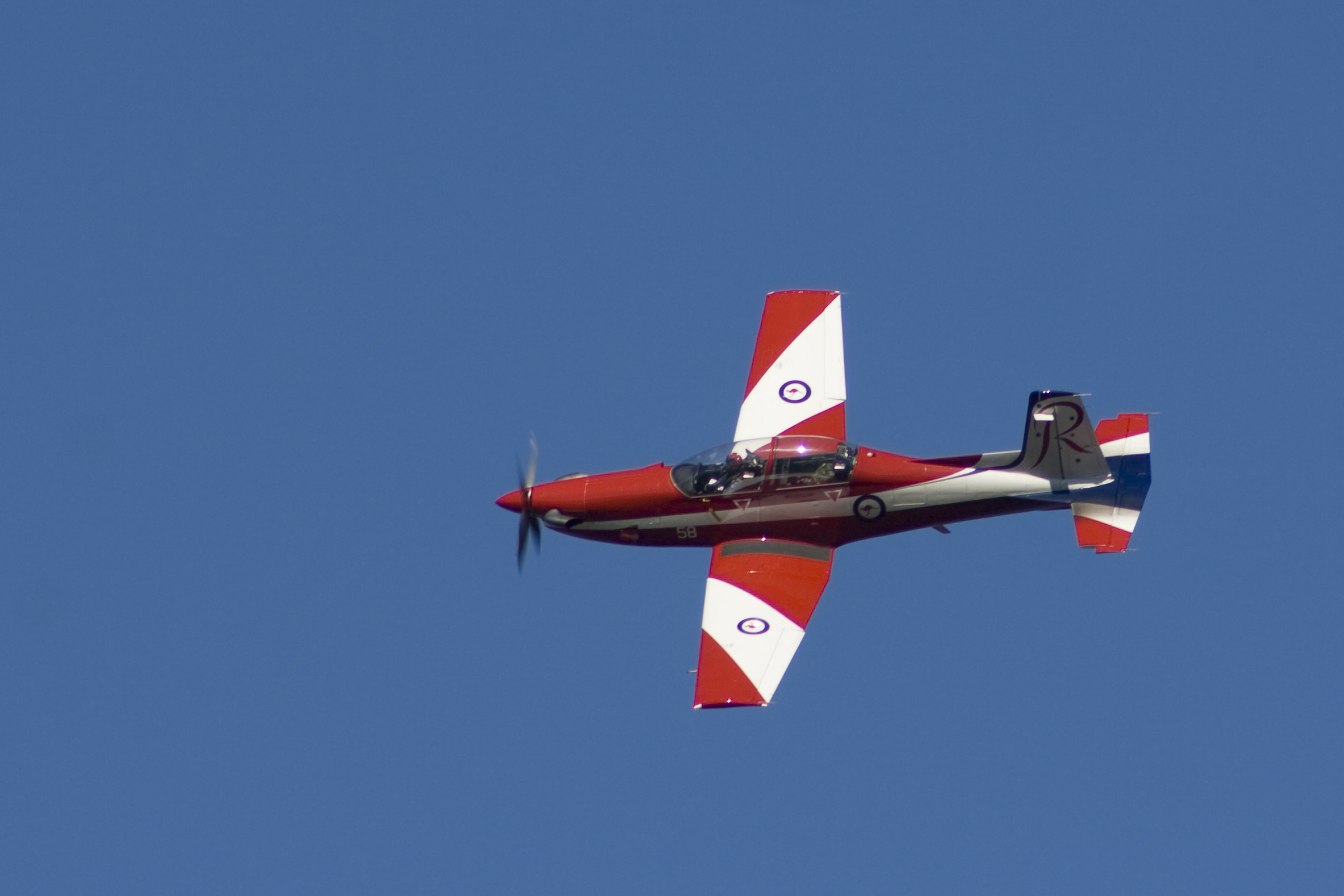
PC-9 of the Roulettes aerobatic team, May 2012

The introduction of the Macchi permitted a brief flirtation with "all-through jet training" starting in 1969, as it was expected to reduce the time necessary to turn out high-quality pilots, and CFS had begun preparing to train instructors for this purpose in 1967. All-through jet training was dropped in 1971, subsequently being labelled "an expensive way of finding out that some pupils lacked the aptitude to become military pilots". Winjeels continued to operate at CFS until replaced by the CT-4 Airtrainer in August 1975. For the next fifteen years, the main types used for instructor training were the CT-4 and the Macchi. CFS also flew Dakotas for twin-engined instructor courses until March 1980; they were further used to train pilots of the Papua New Guinea Defence Force. The school was presented with the Queen's Colour by Governor-General Sir Zelman Cowen in September 1978. In December 1987, CFS took delivery of its first Pilatus PC-9 turboprop trainer, to replace the Macchi for advanced flying instructor training. The Roulettes converted to the PC-9 in 1989–90. The CT-4 was phased out at the school in favour of the PC-9 in December 1991.

CFS continued to operate the PC-9 for pilot instructor training at East Sale, until their phase-out and replacement by the PC-21 in December 2019, under the control of the Air Force Training Group's Air Training Wing, and to administer flying standards across the RAAF. Practising and performing with the Roulettes, which celebrated its fiftieth anniversary in 2020, remains a secondary task for team members after their instructional duties. As well as the Roulettes' displays, the school is responsible for the training and public relations work of the Air Force Balloons, which are co-located with No. 28 Squadron at HMAS Harman in Canberra. In their role supporting RAAF recruitment and public awareness, the two hot-air balloons are often employed in rural areas as an economical alternative to displays by the Roulettes or other aircraft.
