= Bristol Boxkite =

Type of aircraft

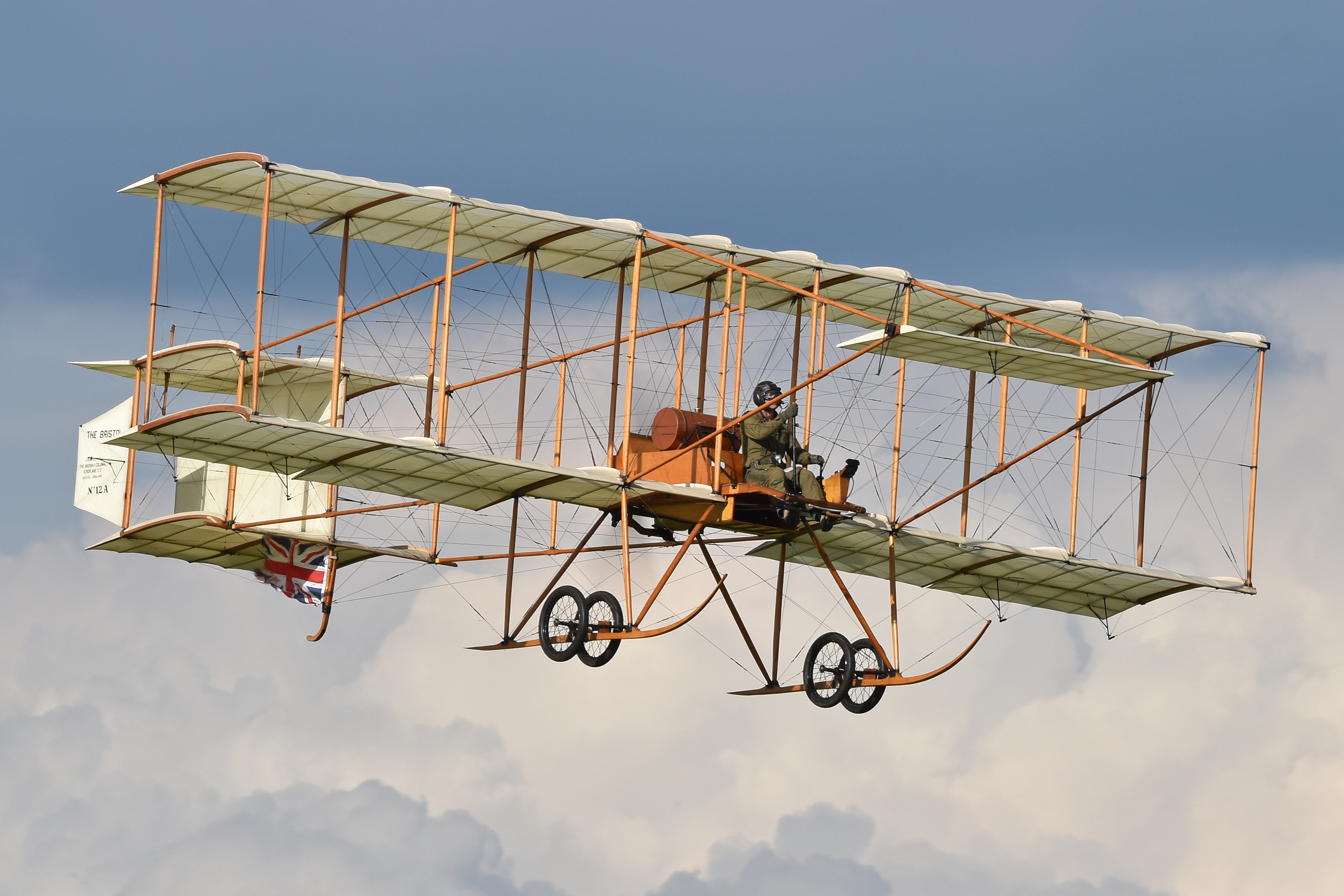
- Boxkite replica, Continental O-200-B engine

General information
- Type: Trainer
- Manufacturer: British and Colonial Aeroplane Company
- Primary users: Bristol Aeroplane Company flying schools. RFC; Imperial Russian Air Service; Australian Flying Corps
- Number built: 78

History
- Manufactured: 1910–14
- Introduction date: 1910
- First flight: 30 July 1910
- Developed from: Farman III, Zodiac Biplane

The Boxkite (officially the Bristol Biplane) was the first aircraft produced by the British and Colonial Aeroplane Company (later known as the Bristol Aeroplane Company). A pusher biplane based on the successful Farman III, it was one of the first aircraft types to be built in quantity. As the type was used by Bristol for instruction purposes at their flying schools at Larkhill and Brooklands many early British aviators learned to fly in a Boxkite. Four were purchased in 1911 by the War Office and examples were sold to Russia and Australia. It continued to be used for training purposes until after the outbreak of the First World War.

== Background ==
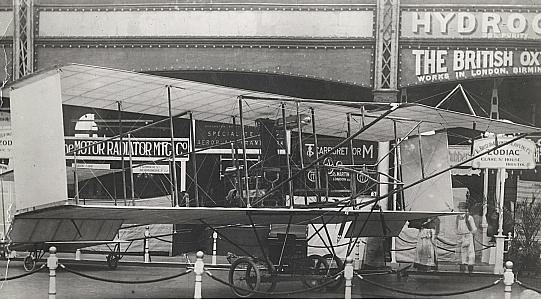
The Zodiac biplane at the 1910 Aero Show. The almost uncambered wing section is clearly visible.

The original intention of Sir George White, the founder and chairman of Bristol Aircraft, was to build licensed copies of the Zodiac biplane, designed by Gabriel Voisin. One example of this design was imported from France and exhibited by Bristol at the 1910 Aero show in London in March 1910, and afterwards taken to Brooklands for flight testing. Initial attempts to get it to fly were entirely unsuccessful. This was largely due to its unsatisfactory wing section (the shallow camber of the Zodiac's wings had been commented upon by the aviation journal Flight), but the aircraft was also underpowered for its weight, and a new set of wings did little to improve performance. A single brief flight on 28 May was achieved by Maurice Edmond, but after an accident that damaged its undercarriage on 10 June it was abandoned, as was work on five more examples being built at Bristol's factory at Filton.

Sir George was advised to acquire rights to build copies of the successful Farman biplane. This proved impossible since George Holt Thomas was negotiating rights with the Farman company, but George Challenger, the chief engineer at Filton, believed that he could produce a satisfactory copy since full details of the Farman machine had been published in Flight. This was authorized by Sir George, and Challenger set to work on drawings for a new aircraft. The first example was constructed in a matter of weeks, using some components from the abandoned production Zodiacs, and was delivered to the company's flying school at Larkhill on Salisbury Plain, where it was first flown on 30 July 1910, piloted by Maurice Edmond. Farman sued Bristol for patent infringement, but the company's lawyers claimed substantial design improvements in matters of constructional detail, and the lawsuit was dropped.

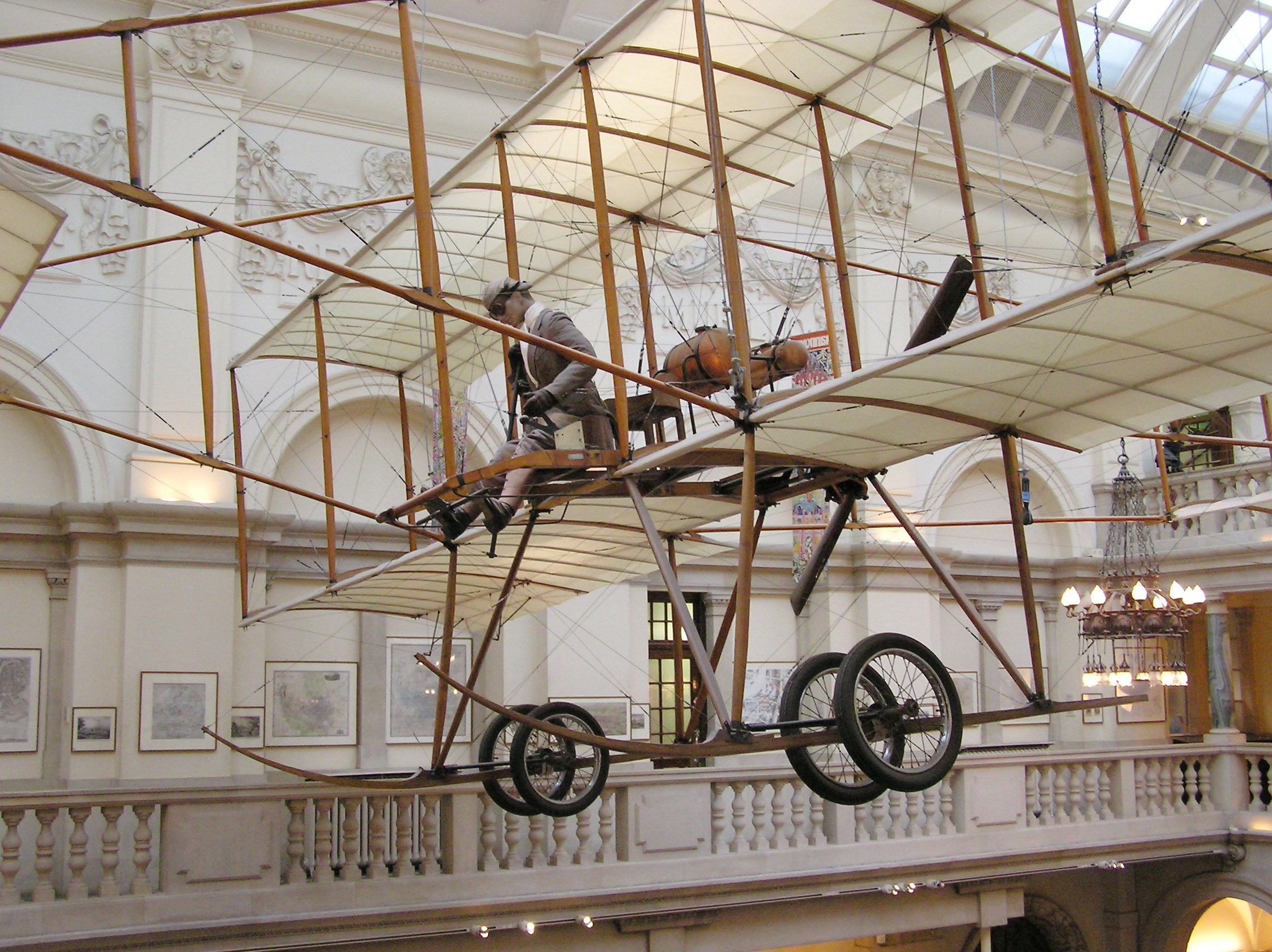
Bristol Boxkite replica (made 1964) at Bristol Museum

== Design and development ==
The Boxkite was a two-bay biplane with an elevator carried on booms in front of the wings and an empennage consisting of a pair of fixed horizontal stabilisers, the upper bearing an elevator, and a pair of rudders carried on booms behind the wing. There were no fixed vertical surfaces. Lateral control was effected by ailerons on both upper and lower wings. These were single-acting, the control cables arranged to pull them down only, relying on the airflow to return them to the neutral position. The wings and fixed rear horizontal surfaces were covered by a single layer of fabric: the other surfaces were covered on both sides.

Power was usually provided by a 50 hp (37 kW) Gnome rotary engine, although other engines were also used. The engine was mounted on a pair of substantial wooden beams mounted above the lower wing: these continued forward to carry the seats, which were arranged in tandem, with the pilot sitting over the leading edge of the wing. The undercarriage consisted of a pair of long skids, each bearing a pair of wheels sprung by bungee cords, and a single sprung tailskid mounted below the leading edge of the lower tailplane.

The first two Boxkites, assigned works numbers 7 and 8, differed in detail from the later production aircraft; the front outrigger booms were braced by a pair of vertical struts and were attached to the ends of the interplane struts. This arrangement was inherited from the Zodiac, being necessary in that aircraft because the front spar of the wing did not also form the leading edge. Additionally the rear elevator had a straight trailing edge. No. 8 also had double-surfaced wings; the wings of No. 7 were single-surfaced with the ribs enclosed in pockets, like production aircraft. No. 7 was initially fitted with a 50 hp (37 kW) Grégoire, but for its first flight this was replaced by a Gnome, although the Grégoire was later refitted for trial purposes: No. 8 had a 50 hp (37 kW) E.N.V.

The first examples built had upper and lower wings of equal span, although most of the aircraft eventually produced had an extended upper wing and were known as the Military Version. The examples of this type sold to the Russian government and the first aircraft sold to the British Army were fitted with a third rudder hinged to the centre leading-edge interplane strut of the tailplane, but this was not made standard.

Two modified Boxkites were produced for competition purposes. The first, No. 44, was a single-seater built to compete in the 1911 Circuit of Europe air race and had reduced wingspan and a nacelle for the pilot, similar to the Bristol Type T. The second, No.69, was a redesign by Gabriel Voisin, who was employed as a consultant by Bristol. This had no front elevator, monoplane tail with a single rudder, and a reduced gap between the wings. It was tested at Larkhill in February 1912, but was evidently unsuccessful since it was soon rebuilt as a standard Boxkite and was to crash in November 1912.

Production continued until 1914, with a total of 78 being built: 60 of these were the extended Military Version, one was a racer (No. 44) and another the Voisin variant (No. 69); all but the last six aircraft were built at Filton. These were built at Brislington by Bristol Tramways.

== Operating history ==
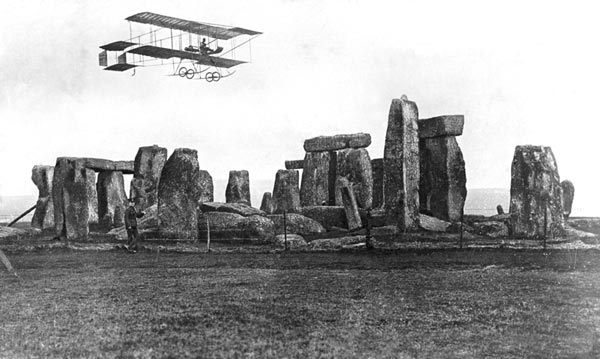
Postcard showing a Bristol Boxkite flying over Stonehenge on Salisbury Plain

After the successful flight on Salisbury Plain No. 7 and a second aircraft, No. 8, were sent to Lanark in 1910 to take part in the aviation meeting held there in August. These aircraft were then assigned to the Bristol flight schools, No. 7 at Brooklands and No. 8 at Larkhill. In September a third aircraft was completed and delivered to Larkhill, and both the Larkill machines participated in the Army manoeuvres held on Salisbury Plain that month. No. 8 was flown by Bertram Dickson, and was captured by Blue team cavalry when it landed in order to report by telephone, and No. 9 by Robert Loraine. This aircraft was equipped with a radio transmitter for trials and was the first aeroplane in the United Kingdom to send a message by radio.

Between 11 and 16 November 1910, a series of demonstration flights were made in Bristol. Temporary hangars were built on Durdham Down and although flying was limited by the weather conditions a crowd of almost 10,000 saw Maurice Tetard make a fifteen-minute flight on the Saturday. The most spectacular flights were made the following Tuesday, when around ten flights were made between 7 and 9 o'clock, including a fifteen-minute flight by Tetard during which he flew over Clifton Suspension Bridge and made a circuit over the suburbs of Redland and Westbury. Weather conditions then deteriorated and only a single flight was made in the afternoon, when Tetard made a single circuit, cutting his flight short owing to the turbulent winds caused by the proximity of the Avon Gorge. On the final day the crowds gathered early but wind conditions prevented any flying. At about half-past three it was announced that there would be no more flying, despite which Tetard then made a short straight-line flight reaching no more than 20 ft in altitude, earning a "cheery ovation" from the crowd by then numbering around 12,000.

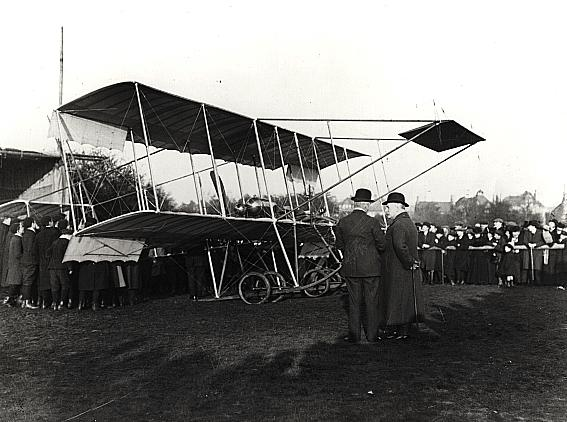
Boxkite at Durdham Down. Sir George White is standing in front of the aircraft.

On 14 March 1911 the British War Office ordered four Boxkites for the planned Air Battalion Royal Engineers, (Note: The Air Battalion became part of the Royal Flying Corps in May 1912.) the first production contract for military aircraft for Britain's armed forces. The first example, powered by a 50 hp Gnome engine, was delivered to Larkhill on 18 May that year. An order for a further four was placed later that year, with the type mainly being used as a trainer. They continued in use with the Air Battalion and Royal Flying Corps (RFC) until December 1912. Four more Boxkites were purchased by the RFC from the Bristol flying school at Brooklands following the outbreak of the First World War; the last of these was written off in February 1915. The Royal Naval Air Service (RNAS) also made use of the Boxkite as a trainer, using it at its training schools at Eastbourne, Eastchurch and Hendon until at least 1915.

Most of the aircraft produced were employed at the Bristol flying schools at Brooklands and Larkhill., which were responsible for training nearly half the pilots who gained licences in Britain before the First World War; many distinguished pilots gained their licence in a Boxkite, including Brigadier-General Henderson, the first commander of the Royal Flying Corps, who gained his licence after less than a week of instruction.

=== Australia ===
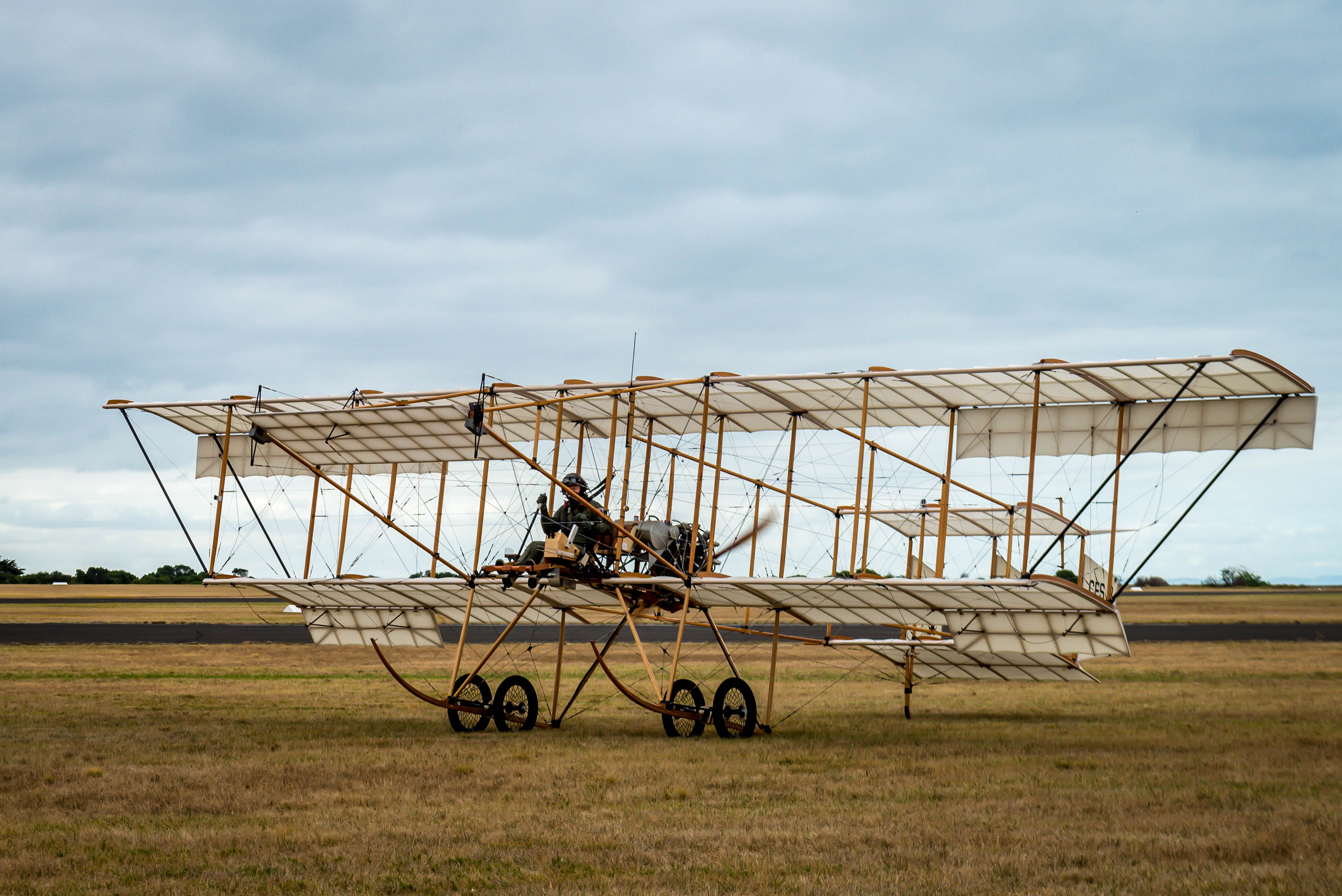
Bristol Boxkite replica at the RAAF Museum

At the end of November 1910, two Boxkites were shipped to Australia for a promotional tour, and in Australia No. 10 was flown first by Joseph Hammond, who made the first aeroplane flight in West Australia from Belmont Park Racecourse on 3 January 1911. On 20 February of that year, Hammond flew the first cross-country flight made between towns in Australia from Altona Bay to Geelong in Victoria, and on 23 February, also at Altona Bay, he made the first passenger flight in Australia, taking his mechanic Frank Coles for a 7½ minute flight. Later that same day he took his wife for a 12½ minute flight, making her the first woman to fly in Australia. Official observers from the Australian Army observed these demonstrations and were also taken for flights. Although reports were favourable, no aircraft were ordered. After the flights in Melbourne Hammond returned to his home in New Zealand and the demonstrations in Sydney were made by his assistant, Leslie Macdonald, who took a photographer from the Daily Telegraph for a 25-minute flight over Sydney on 6 May, making the first aerial photographs to be taken in Australia. By 19 May, 72 flights totalling 765 miles had been made by No. 10; No. 11, still in its crate, was sold to W. E. Hart of Penrith, N.S.W, who used the aircraft to become the first Australian to gain a pilot's licence in Australia.

The Boxkite would go on to be ordered by Central Flying School, the first military aviation unit in Australia, and aircraft number 133 would perform the first flight by the CFS, and first official Australian military flight, on 1 March 1914 by Lieutenant Eric Harrison. It would continue to serve until written off in 1917. The second Boxkite to enter CFS service was actually built by the school after Bristol ceased making the aircraft available for order, and thus the Boxkite became the first military aircraft assembled in Australia. In all, four Boxkites would serve the CFS, training pilots through World War I.

=== India ===
A further two were sent to India, including No. 12, the first Boxkite built with an extended upper wing. In India the first flights were made by Henri Jullerot in Calcutta on 6 January 1911 before a crowd of 100,000. He was invited to take part in the Deccan cavalry manoeuvres that were about to take place, and made a number of flights carrying Captain Sefton Brancker as his observer. He also took part in the Northern cavalry manoeuvres at Karghpur. Flying conditions there were demanding, with many rough landings caused by the terrain, and eventually No. 9 was cannibalised to provide spares to keep No. 12 flying.

=== Other exports ===
Nos 27 and 28 were sold to the Belgian Joseph Christiaens, who used them to make the first aeroplane flight in Singapore on 16 March 1911. He then took the aircraft to South Africa where a series of exhibition flights were made in Pretoria, and Christiaens sold No.28 to John Weston, who also became the Bristol company's representative in South Africa. Other examples were exported to Germany (2), Spain (2) and single machines to Romania, India, Bulgaria and Sweden.

== Flyable reproductions ==
No original Bristol Boxkites aeroplanes have survived, but three authentic flyable reproductions were built by the F. G. Miles group for the film Those Magnificent Men in Their Flying Machines. These were initially powered by a 65 hp (48 kW) Rolls-Royce Continental A65 air-cooled flat four, but this produced insufficient power, since the higher RPM of the mid-20th century engine driving a small-diameter modern propeller was inefficient at the low airspeed achieved by the Boxkite. The 65 hp flat-four was therefore replaced by a 90 hp (67 kW) Continental O-200-B engine. With the increased power these proved flyable enough to be used for cross-country flights between filming locations. Another tribute to the soundness of the design is that the calculations made for the purpose of granting the necessary Certificates of Airworthiness found that the stressing of the design was very close to modern requirements. After filming one was sent to the Bristol City Museum and Art Gallery. Another went to the Shuttleworth Collection in Bedfordshire (where it is still flown during flying displays, when the weather permits), and the third to the Museum of Australian Army Flying in Queensland.

A Bristol Boxkite replica was constructed for the Australian Centenary of Military Aviation Air Show 2014. It made its first test flight on 11 September 2013 at RAAF Base Williams, Point Cook. The replica was built at the RAAF Museum over a seven-year period and will be displayed at the museum.

== Specifications (military version) ==
Data from Bristol Aircraft Since 1910

General characteristics

- Crew: 2
- Length: 38 ft 6 in (11.73 m)
- Wingspan: 47 ft 8 in (14.53 m)
- Height: 11 ft 10 in (3.61 m)
- Wing area: 517 sq ft (48.0 m^{2})
- Empty weight: 900 lb (408 kg)
- Gross weight: 1,150 lb (522 kg)
- Powerplant: 1 × Gnome Omega 7-cylinder air-cooled radial piston engine, 50 hp (37 kW)
- Propellers: 2-bladed fixed-pitch pusher propeller

Performance

- Maximum speed: 40 mph (64 km/h, 35 kn)
- Wing loading: 2.22 lb/sq ft (10.8 kg/m^{2})
- Power/mass: 0.043 hp/lb (0.071 kW/kg)

== Military operators ==
Australia

- Central Flying School, Australian Flying Corps at Point Cook, Victoria, Australia operated four Boxkites from 1914 to 1918. The original was built by British & Colonial Aeroplane Company in 1913. A second order in 1914 from Bristol was not fulfilled, and instead, the CFS built a second aircraft from parts in 1915. Two Boxkite XV were ordered in 1916 and built by Grahame-White Aviation Company.

Bulgaria

- Bulgarian Air Force

Romania

- Royal Romanian Air Force

Russia

- Imperial Russian Air Service

South Africa

- Union Defence Forces – South African Air Force

Kingdom of Spain

- Spanish Air Force

Sweden

- Swedish Air Force

United Kingdom

- Royal Flying Corps
  - No. 1 Squadron RFC
  - No. 3 Squadron RFC
  - Central Flying School
- Royal Naval Air Service
  - Eastchurch Naval Flying School

== See also ==
- Curtiss Model D
- Short S 27
- Howard Wright 1910 Biplane
