= William Wallace Allison Burn =

New Zealand military aviator

- Born: 17 July 1891; Melbourne, Australia
- Died: 30 July 1915 (aged 24)
- Burial place: No known grave
- Military career
- Allegiance: New Zealand
- Branch: New Zealand Military Forces
- Service years: 1911–1915 †
- Rank: Lieutenant
- Units: Mesopotamian Half Flight; New Zealand Staff Corps
- Conflicts: First World War; Mesopotamian campaign
- Awards: Mention in Despatches (2)

William Wallace Allison Burn (17 July 1891 – 30 July 1915) was a New Zealand aviator, who served with the New Zealand Military Forces during the First World War.

Born in Melbourne, Australia, Burn was educated in Christchurch, New Zealand, and joined the New Zealand Military Forces in 1912, volunteering for the New Zealand Staff Corps. In 1913 he was selected to be sent to England to receive flight training. Qualifying as a pilot the following year, he was seconded to the Royal Flying Corps soon after the outbreak of the First World War and sent to Mesopotamia to serve with the Indian Expeditionary Force (IEF) there. He flew as an observer with the Mesopotamian Half Flight, which conducted reconnaissance flights in support of the operations of the IEF on the Tigris and Euphrates. His aircraft was forced down with mechanical problems while on a flight to Basra and he and his pilot were killed by hostile Arab tribesmen. He was the first New Zealand aviator to be killed in action.

== Early life ==
William Wallace Burn, later known as William Wallace Allison Burn, was born in Melbourne, Australia on 17 July 1891. His parents, Forbes Burn, a station manager, and his wife Isabel née Ayers were originally from Christchurch in New Zealand. The Burn family later moved back to Christchurch, where Burn went to Christchurch Boys' High School.

Interested in the military, Burn joined the Cadet Corps and was an enthusatic participant, eventually becoming an officer. Once his education was completed, he joined the New Zealand Military Forces, being accepted into the New Zealand Staff Corps, with the rank of second lieutenant. His first posting was to the Canterbury Military District, where he served as the adjutant of the 1st (Canterbury) Regiment, a unit of the Territorial Force.

== First World War ==
By 1913, there was increasing awareness in the New Zealand Military Forces of the potential role aviation could play in defending the country's coastline against naval intruders. As it was recognised that the country would need trained aviation personnel, Burn was selected to go to England. Departing in late 1913, he received flight training at Hendon, in London, before going to the Royal Flying Corps' Central Flying School at Upavon. Among his contemporaries at the time was Hugh Trenchard, the future marshal of the Royal Air Force, and Hugh Dowding, who would lead Fighter Command during the Battle of Britain. Burn qualified for his flying badge in February 1914 and two months later returned to New Zealand.

By the time Burn arrived in New Zealand, the First World War had broken out. As the first qualified pilot of the New Zealand Military Forces, it had been intended that he would superintend the aviation sector in New Zealand. However, the country's sole military aircraft, a Blériot XI gifted by the British government, was in storage and there was little for him to do. Instead, he was posted to the Auckland Infantry Regiment.

=== Mesopotamian campaign ===
Shortly afterwards, the Dominions of the British Empire received a request from India for pilots for service in the Mesopotamian campaign against the Ottoman Empire. As Burn was a qualified pilot, he was seconded to the Royal Flying Corps as a flying officer and attached to the Indian Expeditionary Force (IEF) fighting in Mesopotamia. He was posted to the Mesopotamian Half Flight, largely made up of Australians from the Australian Flying Corps under the command of Captain Henry Petre. Based at Basra, the Flight's initial complement were Maurice Farman MF.11 Shorthorn and Maurice Farman Longhorn aircraft, later joined by Caudron G.3 aircraft. All had been found to be unsuitable for use on the Western Front due to their poor performance.

As its aircraft were unarmed, the role of the Half Flight was to conduct reconnaissance missions, supporting the advance of the IEF's 6th Division up the Tigris by gathering information of the movements and dispositions of the Ottoman forces. The Ottomans had no aircraft in the region so there was little danger from this quarter, but the Half Flight's aircraft were under-powered and unreliable. If they were forced to land for mechanical reasons, there was no guarantee that the local Arabs would be welcoming.

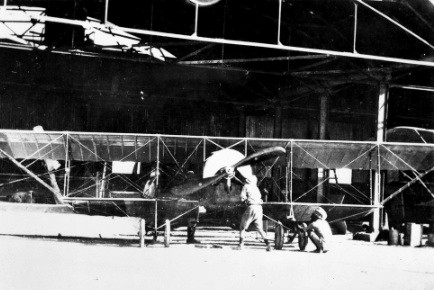
Caudron G.3 of the Mesopotamian Half Flight

Burn's flights were as an observer; his first, on 31 May 1915, was to Amara on the Tigris, a key objective for the 6th Division. Further flights were made on 2 June and it was noted that there was little activity in Amara. When this was reported back, a small force from the 6th Division was sent forward and they secured the town. Burn was the observer on a subsequent flight to Kut, mapping out a route through an uncharted part of the Tigris region. When the direction of the campaign switched to the Euphrates, the Half Flight conducted reconnaissance flights to identify potential sites for amphibious landings by the Allies. By now the Flight were overstretched with some aircraft affected by mechanical issues.

By mid-July, the Half Flight received two Caudron G.3s, the engines of which, like the Farmans, were prone to overheating. Burn flew as observer on one of these in support of operations to secure the town of Nasiriyah. On 30 July, with the town in Allied hands, he and his pilot, George Merz, an Australian, returned to Basra. On the way, their Caudron suffered an engine failure and they had to put down in a marshland. While facilitating a repair, they were attacked by a party of 15 Arabs. Armed with revolvers, Burn and Merz attempted a fighting retreat to a distant refueling station but were killed. Although a search party located their Caudron, the bodies of the two aviators were never found. Arab witnesses were able to provide details of the fates of Burn and Merz, who were the first military aviators from their respective countries to be killed in action.

Burn's name is recorded on the Basra Memorial, which commemorates the nearly 40,500 personnel of the British Empire who were killed in operations in Mesopotamia during the First World War and the immediate postwar period. He was posthumously mentioned in despatches twice, firstly for his work during the operations at Amara and then for those along the Euphrates.
