= Herb Plenty =

Australian Air Force officer

Group Captain Herbert Clarence Plenty, DFC and Bar, (2 February 1921 – 13 May 2013) was an officer in the Royal Australian Air Force (RAAF).

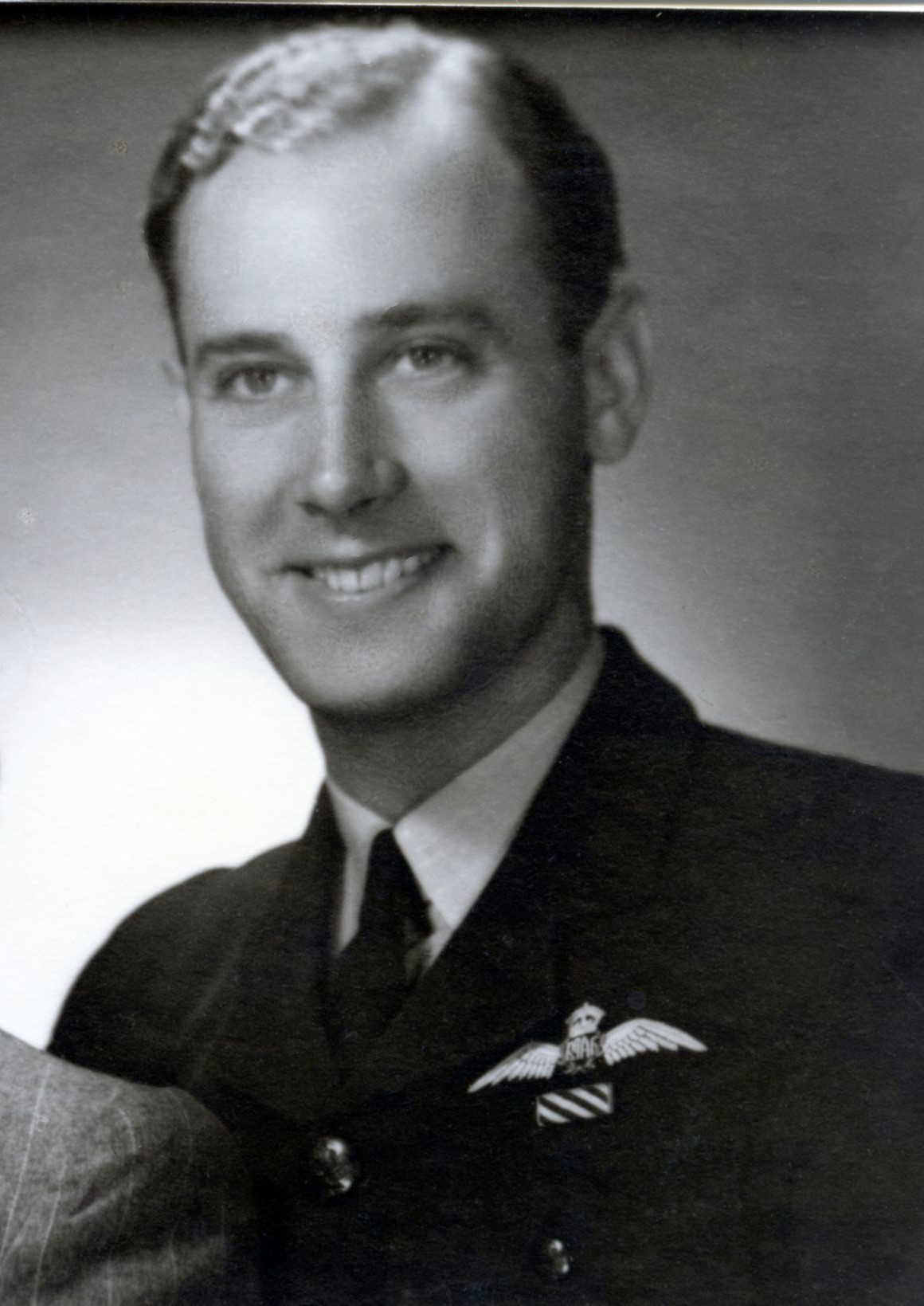
Flight Lieutenant H C Plenty DFC and Bar, RAAF

Born in Napperby, South Australia, Plenty joined the RAAF in 1939 and began his career flying biplanes. As a Hudson pilot with No. 8 Squadron he flew against the Japanese in Malaya and the Dutch East Indies in the first months of the Pacific War. Later flying Beauforts with 100 Squadron in New Guinea. His achievements earned him the Distinguished Flying Cross and Bar. Plenty's post-war commands included Directorate of Flying Safety, Central Flying School, No. 78 (Fighter) Wing, RAAF Laverton (now part of RAAF Williams), and Directorate of Organisation and Administration.

== Early career ==
According to his interview for RAAF Historical Section on 5 November 1996, Plenty was born into a farming family in Napperby, South Australia. Plenty's interest in flying was kindled as a boy reading the exploits of aviation heroes such as Kingsford-Smith and Bert Hinkler. He took flying lessons at the Spencer Gulf Aero Club and sent an application to enlist in the RAAF when he was aged just 16. He applied again after his 18th birthday and was accepted on the 1st of September 1939. Australia declared war on the 3rd of September 1939 and the following day Plenty arrived at RAAF Base Point Cook for initial training. Due to the sudden need to train many more pilots, the RAAF engaged civilian flying schools to provide initial flying training, and Plenty was sent to No. 26 Pilots Course at Kingsford-Smith Aero Club, Mascot NSW, training on the de Havilland Gipsy Moth, and then to No. 21 Squadron RAAF, Laverton Victoria, training on the Hawker Demon. After graduation he was posted to No. 2 Squadron, also at Laverton, flying the Avro Anson. In June 1940 he was posted to No. 8 Sqn, at Fairbairn, Canberra, flying the new Lockheed Hudson bomber. In August the squadron was posted to Sembawang, Singapore, and flew the Hudsons up via Alice Springs, Darwin, and Surabaya. No. 8 Sqn was the first to be posted to RAF Station Kota Bharu, on the Malay Thai border, from March to August 1941, when No. 1 Sqn RAAF took over in Kota Bharu. Facilities were very basic, and the airfield had no defenses such as anti-aircraft guns or fighter aircraft based there. On leave in Singapore Plenty visited the Royal Navy battleship HMS Prince of Wales and battle cruiser HMS Repulse which arrived in Singapore on 2 December. The two capital ships were leading Force Z. No. 8 Sqn deployed to RAF Station Kuantan, Malaya in early December 1941.

=== Second World War ===
Just after midnight on the 8th of December 1941 local time (7am on 7 December Hawaii time) the Imperial Japanese Army landed troops at Kota Bharu where they faced forces from the British 9th Infantry Division. This was 90 minutes before the attack on Pearl Harbor. Hudsons from No. 1 Sqn at Kota Bharu went into the attack, bombing the landing transports and troops, and sinking the Imperial Japanese Navy transport Awajisan Maru, which was the first Japanese ship of any kind to be sunk in World War II by enemy action. No. 8 Sqn Hudsons were sent into the attack around an hour later.

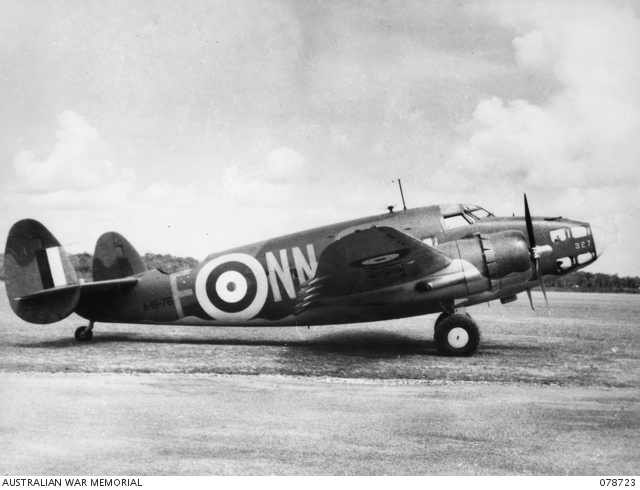
RAAF Lockheed Hudson A16-76 (F-NN) No.8 Squadron Singapore August 1940

In the RAAF Historical Section interview Plenty recounted that on the morning of 10 December 1941, he was on a reconnaissance flight over the South China Sea off the coast from Kuantan, when the crew sighted Force Z and witnessed the attack and sinking of the Prince of Wales and Repulse. Throughout the remainder of December and into January, No. 8 Squadron was tasked with daily low-level reconnaissance, observing Japanese shipping movements. On the morning of 24 January 1942, Plenty was captaining Hudson A16-87 with his usual crew of Ken Hewett second pilot, Ashley Frost radio operator and gunner, and Bill Jacobson turret gunner, in formation with a second Hudson, A16-11, captained by C H ‘Spud’ Spurgeon, when they were attacked by two Mitsubishi A6M Zeros. Spurgeon’s Hudson was quickly shot down, with only Spurgeon surviving. He was later captured by the Japanese and spent the remainder of the war a prisoner. Meanwhile, Plenty had flown into clouds but shortly after his exit found the Zeros waiting for him. His Hudson was also rapidly shot down, however he managed to get it onto the sea without serious injury and the crew were all able to evacuate, inflating their life raft after the Zeros had departed. The crew, aided by local Chinese made their way to the mainland near Mersing, and on foot down the coast walking for two days before finding a hidden Malay boat and sailing to the Johore radar station where they were picked up by a British mine sweeper and returned to Singapore on 29th of January. The following day they flew to P2 airfield near Palembang, Sumatra, and rejoined No. 8 Sqn there, were they found they had all been posted ‘missing presumed killed’ and their families informed. Plenty flew his last operational sortie with No. 8 Sqn on 20 February 1942, the 61st since 8th of December 1941. Plenty was awarded a Distinguished Flying Cross (DFC) for ‘continued reconnaissance along enemy occupied territory. On many occasions he was attacked by enemy fighters and on one occasion was shot down…the day after his arrival back at Singapore, Flight Lieutenant Plenty was again carrying out reconnaissance patrols over the same territory’. At the end of February Plenty was evacuated to Broome, Australia, but was unable to get a seat on a forward flight until the morning of 2 March. The following day Broome was bombed.

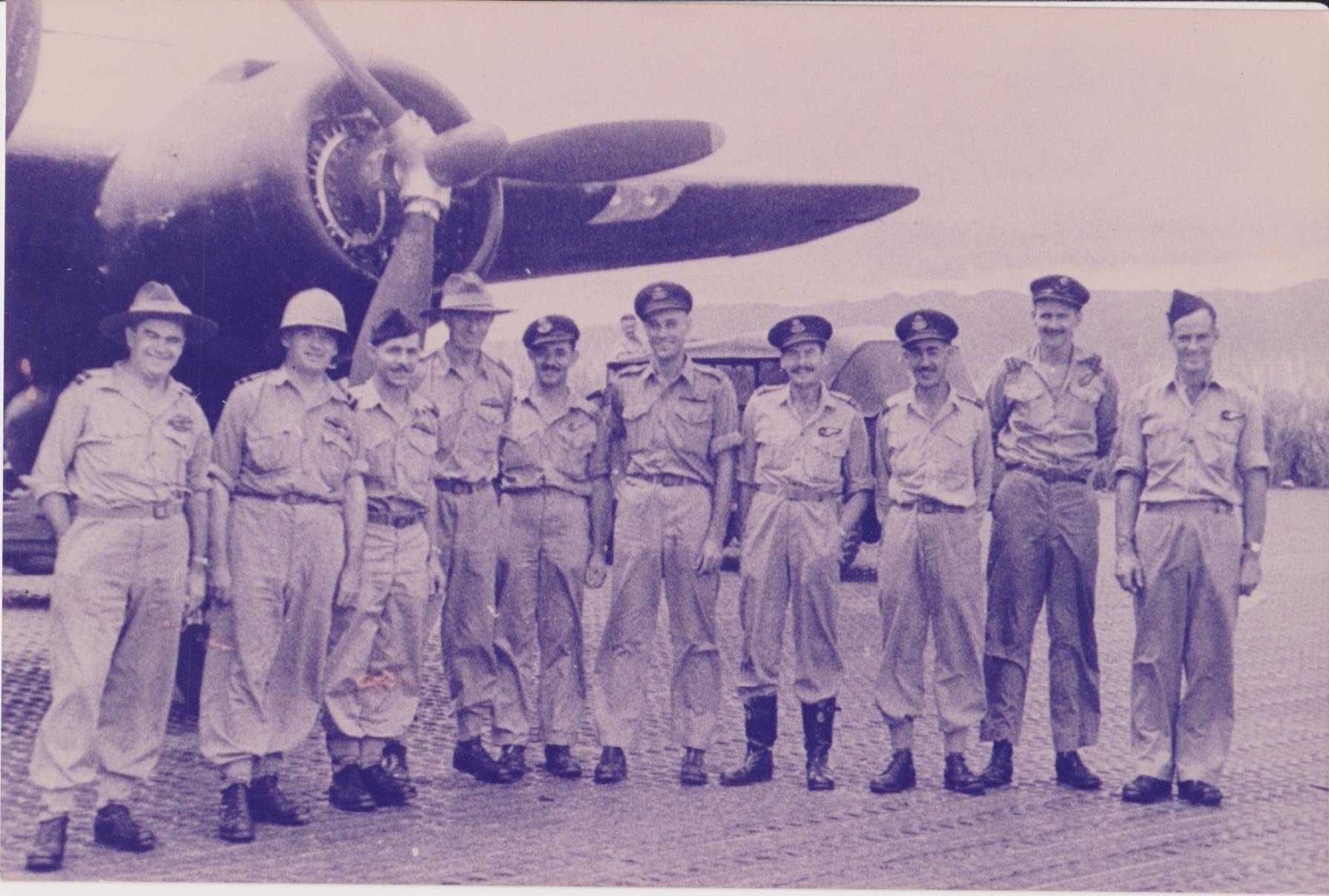
No. 100 Beaufort Squadron New Guinea Herb Plenty 6th from left

Plenty was posted to No. 1 Operational Training Unit as a flying instructor on the RAAF Bristal Beaufort bomber. After thirteen months he volunteered for a second tour of duty and was posted as a flight commander to RAAF No. 100 Beaufort Squadron at Milne Bay, Papua New Guinea, on 8 November 1943, flying bombing strikes against Japanese positions on New Britain, on occasions leading formations of up to thirty bombers. After the Japanese retreat from New Britain, Plenty led strikes against Japanese positions in New Guinea. On 11 August 1944 Plenty completed his nine-month operational tour, having carried out 65 strikes. During his posting to No. 100 Sqn Plenty was awarded a Bar to his DFC for ‘courage and resourcefulness, together with his gallant and inspired leadership’.

== Post-war career ==
Plenty was Commanding Officer No. 1 Communications Unit based at Essendon aerodrome, Melbourne from October 1945 to August 1948, during which time he was promoted to Wing Commander. No.1 Communications Unit was the RAAF VIP unit and notable guests included the Duke and Duchess of Gloucester, Lieutenant General ‘Red Robbie’ Robertson, Field Marshal Viscount Montgomery of Alamein, as well as Australian politicians. In 1952 Plenty was commander at RAAF Momote Manus Island, overseeing the rebuilding of the airstrip and other structures destroyed during WWII. In October 1953 Plenty was appointed Commanding Officer No. 1 Basic Flying Training School at Wagga Wagga NSW, where he hosted HM Queen Elizabeth II and Prince Philip, Duke of Edinburgh during the 1954 Royal Tour. Plenty was Director of Flying Safety in Canberra from 1960 to 1962 at the time of the CAC Sabre tragedies (A94-924, A94-926 & A94-937) which occurred over a nine-week period in 1960. Plenty carried out the first accident investigation following the death of Flight Lieutenant Ross Allen of No. 75 Squadron, concluding that Allen had been struck and killed by the Sabre canopy when attempting to eject. His conclusion was rejected by Chief of Air Staff (CAS) and Deputy CAS who argued that it was impossible as the aircraft were properly designed. It wasn't until the third fatality investigation confirmed Plenty's initial report, that the Sabres were grounded until a new canopy release system was engineered. Plenty was Commanding Officer Central Flying School at RAAF Base East Sale, Victoria, from January 1962 to June 1964. Shortly after taking command the RAAF Aerobatics team the Red Sales, flying de Havilland Vampire aircraft, experienced one of the RAAF's worst peace time training accidents when all four aircraft impacted the ground during a barrel roll, killing all six aircrew. In order to restore confidence, as soon as the immediate shock had eased Plenty announced the creation of a new aerobatic team, the Telstars, which he initially led, before handing over to Sqn Leader Lyle Klaffer. Plenty's first wingman, Flt Lt Peter Scully (later Air Vice marshal) described the rebuilding process as a ‘very impressive piece of leadership’. As Group Captain, Plenty was Officer Commanding No. 78 Fighter Wing RAAF Butterworth from 1964 to 1966. The Wing comprised No. 3 Squadron, No. 77 Squadron, and No. 79 Squadron, which was based in Ubon Thailand, and No. 478 Maintenance Squadron. He then served as Officer Commanding RAAF Base Laverton from July 1966 to 1971. Plenty finished his career as Director General of Organisation and Administration at Air Force Office, Canberra.

=== Retirement ===
After retirement in Canberra Plenty attended university and joined the local aeroclub where he flew his Piper PA-28 Cherokee. He wrote and published a number of books including his autobiography Singapore Slip. He died in Canberra on 13 May 2013 aged 92, survived by his wife Margaret and five children.

== Bibliography ==
Balfe, J.D. War Without Glory Macmillan Australia, 1984

Bennett, John. Highest Traditions: the history of No. 2 Squadron RAAF, Australian Government Publishing Service, 1995

Japanese Advance 1941-1942 – Anzac Portal Japanese Advance 1941-1942 - Anzac Portal accessed 31/12/2022

Johnson, Mark. Whispering Death, Allen & Unwin, 2011

King, Colin, M. Song of the Beauforts Air Power Development Centre, 2008, Canberra

Murphy, R. RAAF Personalities Manuscript kept by the Australian War Memorial, 1998, Canberra

National Archives of Australia, NAA_ItemNumber30718974 PLENTY Herbert Clarence Service Number 03103

National Archives Of Australia, NAA_itemNumberA9186-21 RAAF Unit History sheets (Form A50) [Operations Record Book - Forms A50 and A51] Number 8 Squadron Oct 39 - Jan 46

National Archives of Australia, NAA_Item number A9186,123 RAAF Unit History Sheets (Form A50) Operations Record Book - Forms A50 and A51 Number 100 Squadron Mar 42 - Aug 46

Odgers, G. Air War Against Japan 1943-45 Australian War Memorial 1957, Canberra

Plenty, H.C. Singapore Slip Len Pty Publishing, 1990, Canberra

RAAF Historical Section interview 5 November 1996

Shores, Christopher et al., Bloody Shambles Volume One the Drift to War to the Fall of Singapore, Grub Street, 1992

Shores, Christopher et al., Bloody Shambles Volume Two the Defence of Sumatra to the Fall of Burma, Grub Street, 1993

Stephens, Alan. Going Solo - The Royal Australian Air Force, 1946-1971, Big Sky Publishing Pty Ltd, 1995
