= Martinsyde S.1 =

S.1
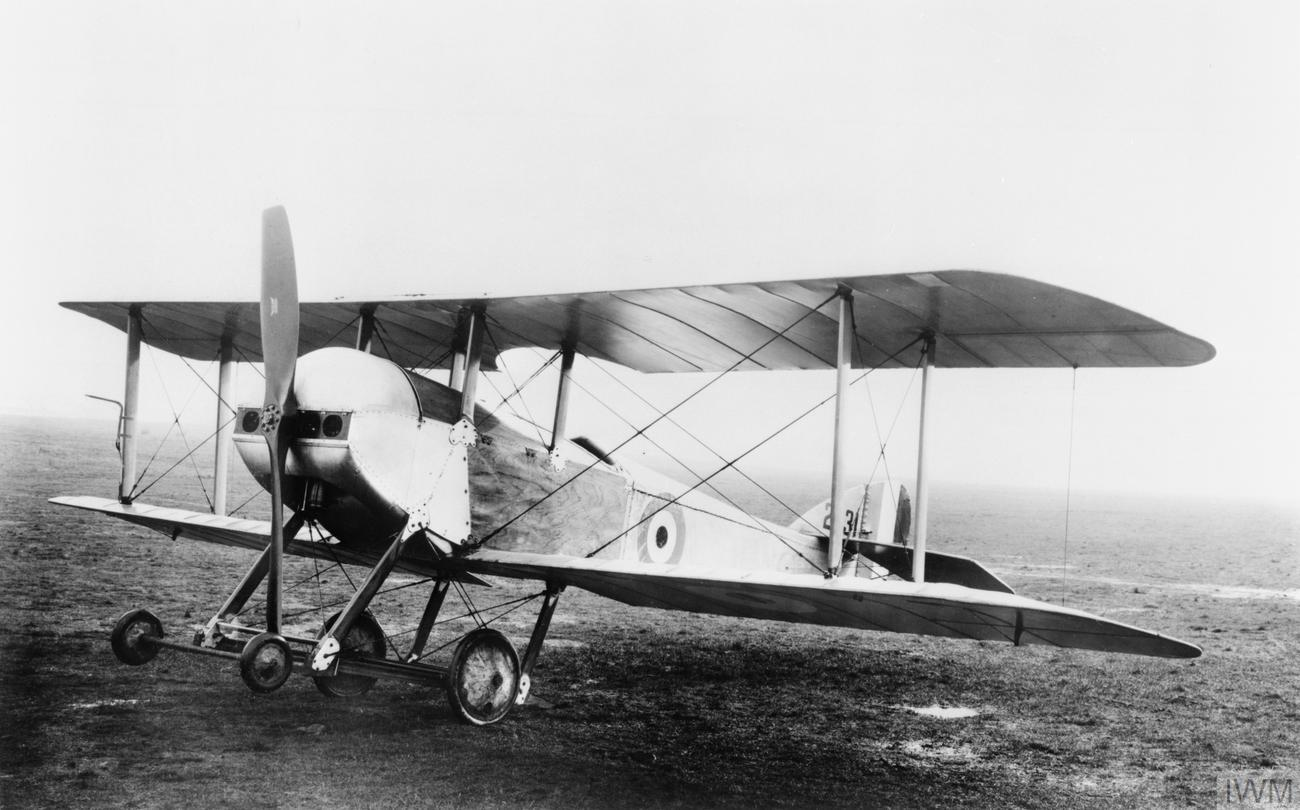

General information
- Type: Single-seat scout
- Manufacturer: Martin-Handasyde
- Primary user: Royal Flying Corps
- Number built: 60

History
- Introduction date: 1914

The Martin-Handasyde Scout 1 was a British biplane aircraft of the early part of the First World War built by Martin-Handasyde Limited.

== Design and development ==
It was a single-seat biplane with a Gnome engine in tractor configuration. An unusual feature was the undercarriage where two small nose wheels were mounted on the forward tips of the skids, ahead of the two main wheels, giving it a practical but cumbersome appearance.

== Operational service ==
Just before the outbreak of war small orders were placed by the Royal Flying Corps among private firms for untried types of single-seater fighters, including the Martinsyde scout. Sixty of the S.1 were built, the first going to France on the 1st March 1915. Various Squadrons received two or three Martinsydes to escort reconnaissance aircraft and bomber missions. They continued in service until the end of 1915 on the Western Front before being relegated to training. Although initially intended for use in Home Defence operating from the UK, it was found to be inadequate for that too. It was reported to be unstable, and it was the aircraft Captain Louis Strange was flying in a combat with a German two-seater, when one of the oddest incidents of WW1 took place. He was changing a drum on his overhead Lewis gun, when the aircraft turned over - and he fell out. However, he held on with one hand to the spade grip of the gun, and somehow managed to hook one leg into the cockpit, then the other. The plane righted itself, and he fell back in, breaking the seat. The German crew, convinced they saw their opponent fall out, claimed a kill, and were (so it was said by the ace, Bruno Loerzer, who was based in the area), ribbed afterwards, when no wreckage was found. ('The Friendless Sky' - A McKee)

== Operators ==
Australia

- Australian Flying Corps
  - Mesopotamian Half Flight

United Kingdom

- Royal Flying Corps
  - No. 1 Squadron RFC
  - No. 2 Squadron RFC
  - No. 4 Squadron RFC
  - No. 5 Squadron RFC
  - No. 6 Squadron RFC
  - No. 9 Squadron RFC
  - No. 10 Squadron RFC
  - No. 12 Squadron RFC
  - No. 14 Squadron RFC
  - No. 16 Squadron RFC
  - No. 18 Squadron RFC
  - No. 19 Squadron RFC
  - No. 20 Squadron RFC
  - No. 22 Squadron RFC
  - No. 23 Squadron RFC
  - No. 24 Squadron RFC
  - No. 25 Squadron RFC
  - No. 30 Squadron RFC

== Specification ==
Data from War Planes of the First World War: Volume One Fighters.

General characteristics

- Crew: One
- Length: 21 ft 0 in (6.4 m)
- Wingspan: 27 ft 8 in (8.43 m)
- Height: 8 ft 2 in (2.5 m)
- Wing area: 280 sq ft (26.01 m^{2})
- Powerplant: 1 × Gnome rotary piston , 80 hp (60 kW)

Performance

- Maximum speed: 87 mph (140 km/h, 76 kn)

Armament

- Forward firing 0.303in (7.7mm) Lewis machine gun

== See also ==
Related lists

- List of aircraft of the Royal Air Force
