= Mesopotamian Half Flight =

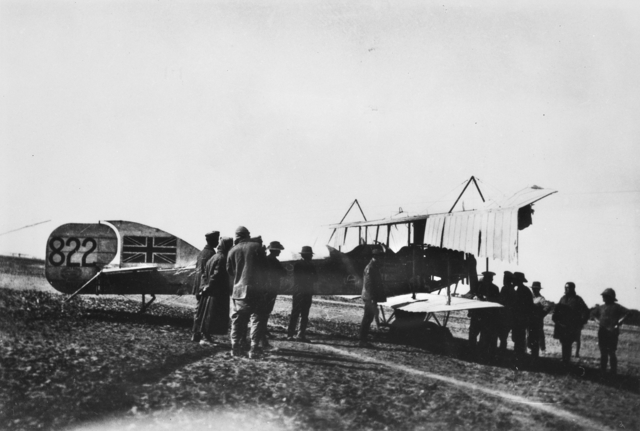
- Members of the Half Flight gather around a Short 827 seaplane
- Active: 1915–1916
- Country: Australia
- Branch: Australian Flying Corps
- Part of: No. 30 Squadron, Royal Flying Corps
- Engagements: World War I: Mesopotamian campaign

Commanders
- Notable commanders: Henry Petre

The Mesopotamian Half-Flight (MHF), or Australian Half-Flight, was the first Australian Flying Corps (AFC) unit to see active service during World War I. Formed in April 1915 at the request of the Indian Government, the half-flight's personnel were sent to Mesopotamia (modern-day Iraq) where they were equipped with a small number of outdated and barely serviceable aircraft. They later operated in the Tigris Valley in support of British and Indian forces under the command of Major General Charles Townshend. The unit's operations came to an end in December 1915 and the following month the flight was subsumed into other units of the AFC which were being formed in Egypt. It was officially disbanded in October 1916.

== History ==
At the start of World War I, the air forces of the Allied forces were small and primitive. Most of the available aircraft and pilots were assigned to the Western Front. This meant that the Indian Army, which was attacking the Ottoman Empire in Mesopotamia, had no air support. On 8 February 1915, the Australian government received a request for air assistance from the British Government of India. The AFC was still in its infancy and could provide enough aircrews and ground staff for only half a flight: the unit therefore became known as the Mesopotamian Half-Flight, or Australian Half-Flight and Captain Henry Petre was appointed commander.

The Mesopotamian Half-Flight was formed at the Central Flying School on 1 April 1915. Upon establishment, the unit consisted of four officers and 41 enlisted personnel. The personnel assigned to the Half-Flight included four of the seven trained pilots in Australia at the time. The Australians were to be augmented by personnel from the Indian Army and New Zealand. The AFC contingent sailed for Bombay, and on 20 April it left for Basra.

The half-flight's aircraft were to be provided by the Indian Government, and on its arrival in Basra on 26 May, two Maurice Farman Shorthorns and a Maurice Farman Longhorn were handed over. These three biplanes were of a "pusher" design, so-called because the propeller was placed aft of the engine, behind the cockpit. The planes were already obsolete and were not suitable for the desert conditions. To start with, their top speed was only 50 mph (80 km/h), while the desert wind (known as the shamal) often reached 80 mph (129 km/h). Secondly, the warm desert air reduced the aircraft lift capability, rendering them unable to take off on occasions. The Longhorn was a second-hand aircraft and had persistent mechanical problems, meaning that it spent much time being repaired.

After arrival, the aircraft were immediately put to use on reconnaissance missions, operating in the Tigris Valley in support of British and Indian forces under the command of Major General Charles Townshend. Shortly afterwards, the Indian Army captured the town of Amarah, and after arriving there in early June, the half-flight began operations in support of an advance towards Kut from Amarah, with intervening operations in Nasiriyeh. On 4 July, the half-flight's equipment was augmented with two Caudron G.3 aircraft, which were still not up-to-date, but generally preferred to the Farmans. On 30 July, one of the Caudrons was forced to land in enemy territory due to mechanical problems. It was later reported that the crew – Lieutenants George Pinnock Merz (a medical doctor and formerly of the Melbourne University Rifles) and William Burn (a New Zealander) – were killed by armed Arab civilians after a running gun-battle over several miles. They were Australia's first air-war casualties. In August the half-flight received four Martinsyde S.1s. On 24 August, it was officially attached to No. 30 Squadron Royal Flying Corps, although the rest of 30 Squadron remained in Egypt for several weeks. The half-flight's personnel and aircraft were incorporated into "B" Flight, No. 30 Squadron.

During September, three Royal Naval Air Service (RNAS) Short 827 floatplanes and their crews, under Squadron Commander Robert Gordon, arrived and were attached to the half-flight. Because the Tigris river was too shallow for the seaplanes to use at that time of year, they were converted into Shorthorns. On 27 September, Kut was captured and the half-flight moved there. Four B.E.2c aircraft and their RFC crews arrived from Egypt in late October.

The Australian personnel of "B" Flight suffered an increasing number of losses with at least two crews being taken prisoner, either after being shot down or suffering engine failure. The Indian Army soon met with stiff opposition outside Baghdad, and were forced back to Kut on 4 December, where the city was besieged. After five months of siege, the garrison at Kut surrendered. Nine Australian ground staff became prisoners of war. Like the rest of the Allied prisoners, AFC personnel taken prisoner in Mesopotamia endured a punishing forced march of 700 miles (1100 km) to the Afion Kara Hissar POW camp in Anatolia in Turkey proper, and only two of them survived captivity (Thomas White and Francis Yeats-Brown). Petre, the last remaining Australian airman in Mesopotamia, left No. 30 Squadron and flew the only remaining Shorthorn to Egypt on 7 December, where he and it were eventually incorporated into the Australian Flying Corps squadrons that were forming there.

The Mesopotamian Half Flight was officially disbanded in October 1916. A total of nine pilots flew with the unit, and of them two were lost, presumed killed, and six were captured. Historian Alan Stephens has written that "overshadowed by the Australian public's interest in the contemporary events at Gallipoli, the Half Flight's heroic and pioneering achievements went largely unrecognised".
