= John Weston (aviator) =

South African aviator (1873–1950)

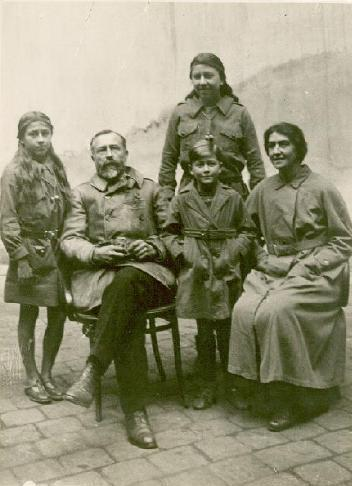
- John and Lily Weston with Anna, Kathleen (left) and Max, probably 1923, Hungary
- Born: Maximilian John Ludwick Weston; 17 June 1872; South of Vryheid
- Died: 24 July 1950 (aged 78); Bergville
- Cause of death: Murder
- Known for: Pioneer aviator and motorcaravanner
- Spouse: Lily Roux
- Children: Anna, Kathleen and Max
- Relatives: sister, Lucy

John Weston (aka Maximilian John Ludwick Weston) was a South African aeronautical engineer, pioneer aviator, farmer and soldier. He travelled extensively in a motor caravan (RV) that he designed and built himself.

Weston was a pioneer of aviation in South Africa. In 1911, Weston founded the Aeronautical Society of South Africa. The Society hosts a bi-annual memorial lecture in his honour.

== Early life ==
Weston's registration of birth is missing from the national records in Pretoria. As a result, many details are uncertain. Weston is said to have been born on 17 June 1873, in an ox wagon at Fort Marshall, northern Natal, South Africa. His father and mother's names are unknown and they may have been British. Weston's mother and sister, Lucy, died in China of cholera in 1928.

== Early career ==
In 1888 Weston was apprenticed as an engineer to the J. Jaspar company in Liege, Belgium and then worked for de Puydt and Poncin Lighting and Power Company, where he rose to the position of partner and technical advisor. In 1900–1901, Weston established M. Weston and Co., (Manufacture de la Lampe a arc, 1900) a company manufacturing electrical lights in Liege.

Weston returned to South Africa during the Second Boer War to fight on the side of the Boers. Left poor after the war, Weston borrowed £100 from a friend and went to America.

In 1903, Weston applied for membership of the British Institute of Electrical Engineers and the company opened an office in Birkenhead, Liverpool. With the assistance of the Russian Embassy in Washington, Weston was employed as an engineer for the Chinese Eastern Railway, working on a stretch near Lake Baikal. It was here he learned to speak Russian. The railway was to be finished by 1905 but on 8 February 1904, Japan declared war on Russia. Initially stranded, Weston escaped via Port Arthur, Manchuria. Subsequently, he travelled widely to seek work. Weston was admitted as a fellow of the Royal Geographical Society on 17 September 1904.

Weston returned to South Africa in early 1905. In August 1906, he married Elizabeth (Lily) Maria Jacoba Roux in Bloemfontein. The couple had three children: Anna MacDougal (b. 1908), Kathleen (b. 1912), and Maximilian John (b. 1915). Weston became a farmer in Doornpoort and later in Kalkdam. In May 1909, the family moved to Brandfort, Free State.

== Contribution to aviation ==
In 1907–1908, at Kalkdam, Weston built an aeroplane from a plan by Gabriel Voisin with a Panhard engine, but it was under-powered and never flew. On 14 September 1910, Weston arrived in England en route to France to pursue his interest in aviation.

=== France ===
In France, Weston trained at the Henri Farman flying school at Étampes. On 30 December 1910, Weston flew solo at Étampes and on 5 January 1911, passed his pilot test. He was granted aviator certificate No. 357 by the French Aero Club on 3 February 1911.

=== Brandfort ===
Weston returned to South Africa in 1911 with an aircraft powered by a 50 hp Gnome engine. The aeroplane was called the Weston-Farman. At Brandfort, Weston imported and sold airplanes and parts. These included the Blériot monoplane, the Farman and the Bristol biplane, Gnome engines, and Chauviére propellers.

=== Aeronautical Society of South Africa ===
Weston was a founding member of the Aeronautical Society of South Africa. He also established the John Weston Aviation Company to raise funds to establish a flying school with a permanent airfield. The company's wealthy sponsors funded flying demonstrations in South Africa and Mozambique. In December 1909, the Frenchman, Albert Kimmerling made the first powered flight in South Africa in East London. In June 1911, Weston flew the Weston-Farman for eight and a half minutes at Kimberley. It was a South African record for the duration of a flight. Demonstrations of the company's five aircraft (one Weston-Farman, three Bristols, and one Farman) followed at Johannesburg, Lorenzo Marques, Bloemfontein, Cape Town, Kenilworth, East London, King Williams Town and Queenstown.

=== Difficulties ===
In 1912, Weston was unsuccessful in his efforts to be appointed as an adviser to the government of Jan Smuts in the investment in military aircraft and pilot training. At that time, the flying demonstrations drew large crowds, but little investment. In January 1913, arrangements were made for flying demonstrations at Brandfort. A large crowd had assembled on the racecourse when a dust storm began and destroyed the airplane. Then, in early February 1912, the Brandfort hangar was destroyed by arson. Weston dismissed the offer of a joint venture with aviator, Cecil Compton Paterson. On 1 July 1913, the Paterson Aviation Syndicate was registered in Kimberley, and on 10 September 1913, Paterson and the Union government entered into an agreement concerning the training of the first South African military pilots for what would later become the South African Air Force.

== World War I ==
Weston moved to England in June 1913 and by October 1913 was working with the Willow's Aircraft Company on military dirigibles. In February 1914, he received British Aeronaut's Certificate No. 38 (for flying balloons) as well as Airship Pilot's Certificate No.23.

At the outbreak of World War I Weston joined the South African forces taking part in the South West Africa Campaign (present day Namibia). He was responsible for providing and maintaining airfields. On 6 February 1915, he joined the South Africa Air Corps (SAAC) with the rank of lieutenant. It was not until 1 May 1915 that aircraft were available to South Africa's military forces and they were then found to be unserviceable. However, Weston was able to place beacons for pilots as far afield as Garub, now in Namibia.

After German forces capitulated in South West Africa on 9 July 1915, Weston and his family travelled to England, arriving in Tilbury on 9 September 1915. On 1 July 1916, he was commissioned as a temporary sub-lieutenant in the Royal Naval Volunteer Reserve, for duties with the RNAS. His first posting was to No. 3 Aeroplane Wing, Manston. On 28 September 1916, he was promoted to temporary acting lieutenant. No. 3 (Naval) Wing] formed during the spring of 1916. Weston's group was one of the first departures to an airfield at Luxeuil-les-Bains, operating over a strategically important German manufacturing region. Weston's role included calibration of compasses and provision of marked maps to observers and airmen, intelligence work and retrieving downed airmen. He also negotiated reparations for local farmers and residents affected by his unit's operations, since he spoke French. From 28 July 1916, Weston also worked as a translator.

On 2 April 1917, Weston was posted as a compass officer to No. 2 wing, RNAS, at Moudros on the Greek island of Lemnos in the Aegean Sea. Weston also managed aerodrome construction, drainage and roadmaking. This posting included a short time as an intelligence officer in Port Said in Egypt. It also included training of pilots, crew and engineers of the Hellenic Naval Air Service. Weston was recorded as "a thorough and efficient mapping officer, very energetic and hardworking...a very capable 'E' officer". He remained in Moudros at least until 1918. Between 1919 and 1921, Weston made two trips to the United States of America on Air Ministry business. He left the service on 22 November 1923.

On the formation of the Royal Air Force from the Royal Naval Air Service and the Royal Flying Corps on 1 April 1918, Weston was commissioned as a Lieutenant in the RAF. In August 1918, while he was seconded to the British Naval Mission to Greece as head of the technical section, he was promoted to "Major whilst specially employed". On 9 January 1919, Weston was promoted to Major in recognition of his distinguished service. In July 1919, Weston was awarded the cross of Officer of the Order of the Redeemer. and in 1923 he was promoted to Vice-Admiral in the Royal Hellenic Navy. Weston later named his South African property, “Admiralty Estate”.

== Travel ==
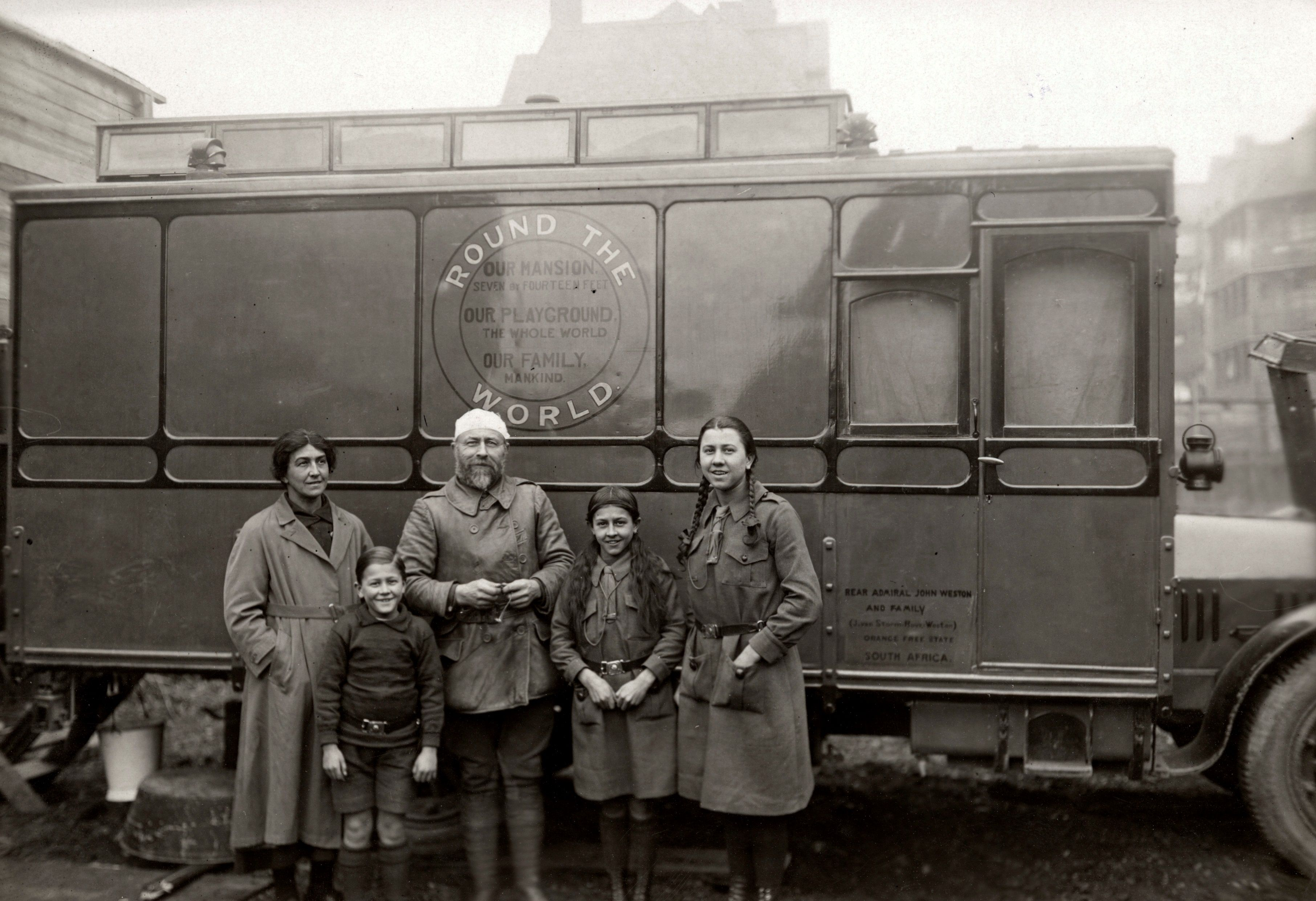
Weston family with their caravan (1924)

=== "Suid Afrika" ===
Weston had a love of travel and encouraged this in his children. While in the US, between 1919 and 1921, Weston purchased a Detroit-manufactured Commerce one tonne truck with a Continental N engine. The truck was shipped to England, where Weston converted it into a motor home which could sleep five. Weston painted the vehicle yellow with black trim and called it "Suid Afrika". The Suid Afrika was essentially a large wooden structure on the rear chassis of the truck. Windows were placed at the front of the living quarters and in the sides of the lantern roof. The vehicle could be hoisted upright onto a ship's deck. A sign on the side read, "Our mansion: 7 by 14 feet, Our field: the world, Our family: mankind." and surrounding this, in a circle, "Round the World." Weston and his family took a tour of 18 weeks in the Suid Afrika from England to Greece. The Westons lived in Athens for two years then in May 1924, returned in the Suid Afrika to England and from there to South Africa. In 1925, Weston made extensive travels through southern Africa. In 1926, the family attempted to return to England, overland. In 1927, Weston found the motor home was not suitable for the trip and returned to Cape Town. (The house in Brandfort was sold in April 1928.)

The motor home remains on display as an exhibit of the Winterton Museum.

=== "Prairie Schooner" ===
The Prairie Schooner was a second motor home built by Weston on the Commerce base. It had a removable living area with a canvas cover and was water-proofed for river crossings. In 1931–1932, Weston travelled from Cape Agulhas, the southernmost point of Africa, to Belgrade, Bulgaria (and to England and back). Weston used the Prairie Schooner for the remainder of his life. In 1975, the Prairie Schooner featured in the International Veteran and Vintage Car Rally from Durban to Cape Town. It was later donated to the Winterton Museum, KwaZulu Natal, South Africa, by Weston's son in law, Carl Rein Weston.

== Later life ==
On his return to South Africa in 1933, Weston bought a farm in the Bergville district, near the Sterkfontein dam. On 24 July 1950, Weston and his wife were injured in an attack. Weston died three days later at the age of 78. His wife survived. She lived with her eldest daughter, Anna, in the Transvaal, and died at age 91.
