= Australian Military Forces =

Official name of the Army of Australia from 1916 to 1980

The Australian Military Forces (AMF) was the official name of the Army of Australia from 1916 to 1980. This encompassed both the (full-time) "regular army", and the (part-time) forces, variously known during this period as the Militia, the Citizen Military Forces (CMF) and the Australian Citizen Military Force (ACMF).

Initially this also included the Australian Flying Corps (AFC) as part of the Australian Imperial Force (AIF). In 1920, the AFC became the Australian Air Corps, which became the Royal Australian Air Force (RAAF) on 31 March 1921. The land forces of Australia were renamed the Australian Army in 1980. In detail:

From	To	Entire Force	Full-time	Part-time	Deployed
1901	1914	Commonwealth Military Forces	Permanent Forces	Citizens Forces	–
1914	1915	Commonwealth Military Forces	Permanent Forces	Citizens Forces	AIF – Australian Imperial Force
1916	1921	AMF – Australian Military Forces	PMF – Permanent Military Forces	CMF – Citizen Military Forces	AIF – Australian Imperial Force
1921	1929	AMF – Australian Military Forces	PMF – Permanent Military Forces	CMF – Citizen Military Forces	–
1930	1939	AMF – Australian Military Forces	PMF – Permanent Military Forces	Militia	–
1939	1942	AMF – Australian Military Forces	PMF – Permanent Military Forces	Militia	AIF – Australian Imperial Force
1943	1946	AMF – Australian Military Forces	PMF – Permanent Military Forces	CMF – Citizen Military Forces	AIF – Australian Imperial Force
1946	1947	AMF – Australian Military Forces	Interim Army	CMF – Citizen Military Forces	–
1947	1980	AMF – Australian Military Forces	ARA – Australian Regular Army	ACMF – Australian Citizen Military Force	–
1980	1991	Australian Army	ARA – Australian Regular Army	GRES or A-RES – Army Reserve	–
1991	1995	Australian Army	ARA – Australian Regular Army	RRES – Ready Reserve	–
1996	–	Australian Army	ARA – Australian Regular Army	Australian Army Reserve	–
