= Jervis (name) =

Jervis is a variant of the name Jarvis. It derives from the personal name Gervase; the element geri meaning spear. Other spellings of the name include Jervoise, and Gervis.

The Jervis family to which belonged John Jervis, 1st Earl of St Vincent, 1st Viscount St Vincent and 1st Baron Jervis is originary of Staffordshire, in England. Came to Portugal Richard Jervis then Richarte or Ricardo Jervis or Jarvis, who settled himself in Funchal, Madeira Island, marrying Maria de Faria, a very noble lady, by whom he had Inácio Jervis or Jarvis de Faria, married to Antónia Vieira de França, daughter of Luís de França and wife Maria Pereira Machado, parents of Captain António Ricardo or Richarte Jervis or Jarvis de Faria, married to Maria Correia de Bettencourt e Atouguia, daughter of António Correia Barbosa (son of José Barbosa and wife Maria Correia) and wife Gandiosa Francisca de Atouguia e Bettencourt (daughter of Captain Amaro de Atouguia and wife and cousin Maria de Atouguia e Bettencourt). His great-grandson António Fernandes Correia Jervis or Jarvis de Atouguia, native of the city of Funchal, Madeira Island, who married Luísa Francisca Correia Henriques, a relative of the 1st Viscount of the Torre Bela and of the 1st Baron, 1st Viscount and 1st Count of Seisal, had Charts of Arms of succession issued on 30 September 1780 and 5 May 1781. The first of those granted arms have, in a quartered shield, the arms of the Jervis, the de Faria, the Correia and the Barbosa. It seems that it was this the first heraldic document with the arms of the Jervises issued in Portugal, because next to the sentence of nobility for the obtaining of the mentioned Chart is found an authentic letter of the London King of Arms. The second of those granted arms have, in a broken shield, only the arms of the Jervis and the de Atouguia. The latter's patrilineal descendants include the 1st Viscount of Atouguia. The surname is used by some in the form Jarvis and by others in the one of Jervis. The arms thet they bear, as much in England as in Portugal, are: sable, chevron armine, accompanied by three merlettes or, set 2 and 1; crest: one of the merlettes of the shield.

== Given name ==
- Jervis Burdick (1889–1962), American track and field athlete
- Jervis Drummond (born 1976), Costa Rican footballer
- Jervis Johnson, games designer for Games Workshop, Nottingham
- Jervis McEntee (1828–1891), American painter
- Jervis Percy (1928–2026), British modern pentathlete

== Surname ==
- Billy Jervis (born 1942), English former professional footballer
- Edward Jervis Jervis, 2nd Viscount St Vincent (1767–1859)
- Jake Jervis (born 1991), English footballer
- John Jervis, 1st Earl of St Vincent (1735–1823), admiral in the Royal Navy
- John B. Jervis (1795–1885), American railroad engineer
- Richie Jervis (born 1976), English cricketer
- Robert Jervis (1940–2021), professor of international affairs at Columbia University
- Simon Swynfen Jervis (born 9 January 1943), art historian
- Thomas Jervis (judge) (1770–1838), English judge
- William Jervis (cricketer, born 1827) (1827–1909), English lawyer and cricketer
- William Jervis (cricketer, born 1839) (1839–1920), English cricketer

== See also ==
- Jervis (disambiguation)
- Jarvis (name)
