= William Jervis =

William Jervis may refer to:

- William Jervis (cricketer, born 1827) (1827–1909), English lawyer and cricketer
- William Jervis (cricketer, born 1839) (1839–1920), English cricketer
- Billy Jervis (born 1942), English footballer
