= 1915 New Year Honours =

Appointments by King George V

The New Year Honours 1915 were appointments by King George V to various orders and honours to reward and highlight good works by members of the British Empire. They were announced on 1 January 1915.

== Order of the Bath ==
=== Knight Commander (KCB) ===
Civil Division

- Edmund Ernest Nott-Bower, Esq., C.B., Chairman of the Board of Inland Revenue.
- Lionel Abrahams, Esq., C.B., Assistant Under Secretary of State, India Office.

=== Companion (CB) ===
Military Division

- Captain Noel Grant, R.N., (H.M.S. "Carmania").
- Captain John Collings Taswell Glossop, R.N. (H.M.A.S. "Sydney").
- Commander James Barr, R.N.R. (H.M.S. "Carmania").

Civil Division

- Captain Richard Webb, R.N.
- Fleet-Paymaster Charles John Ehrhardt Rotter, R.N.
- Basil Phillott Blackett, Esq., First Class Clerk, The Treasury.
- George Russell Clerk, Esq., C.M.G., Senior Clerk, Foreign Office.
- James Edward Masterton Smith, Esq., Private Secretary to the First Lord of the Admiralty.

== Order of the Star of India ==
=== Knight Commander (KCSI) ===
- Major-General William Riddell Birdwood, C.B., C.S.I., C.I.E., D.S.O., late Secretary in the Army Department to the Government of India.

== Order of Saint Michael and Saint George ==
=== Knight Grand Cross (GCMG) ===
- The Right Honourable Sir Louis Mallet, K.C.M.G., C.B., lately His Majesty's Ambassador Extraordinary and Plenipotentiary at Constantinople.

=== Knight Commander (KCMG) ===
- Wilfred Collet, Esq., C.M.G., Governor and Commander-in-Chief of the Colony of British Honduras.
- George Basil Haddon-Smith, Esq., C.M.G., Governor and Commander-in-Chief of the Windward Islands.
- The Honourable George Halsey Perley, Minister of the Dominion of Canada; at present in charge of the office of the High Commissioner in London for the Dominion.
- The Honourable Robert Philp, formerly Premier of the State of Queensland.
- The Honourable Clifford Sifton, K.C., Member of the King's Privy Council for Canada, and formerly Minister of the Interior of the Dominion.

=== Companion (CMG) ===
- Frederic Chapple, Esq., Head Master of Prince Alfred College, Adelaide.
- Charles Thomas Davis, Esq., of the Colonial Office.
- George Joseph Desbarats, Esq., Deputy Minister and Comptroller of the Naval Service of the Dominion of Canada.
- Laurence Stirling Eliot, Esq., I.S.O., lately Under Treasurer of the State of Western Australia.
- Surgeon-Major-General Eugène Fiset, M.D., D.S.O., Deputy Minister of Militia and Defence of the Dominion of Canada.
- Edward Allan Grannum, Esq., Receiver-General of the Colony of Mauritius.
- George Hogben, Esq., Inspector-General of Schools, Dominion of New Zealand.
- Loke Yew, Esq., of Selangor, Federated Malay States.
- Thomas Slingsby Nightingale, Esq., Secretary, Office of the High Commissioner in London for the Union of South Africa.
- John Houston Sinclair, Esq., Chief Secretary, Zanzibar.
- Charles Bruce Locker Tennyson, Esq., Legal Assistant, Colonial Office.
- Captain Charles Walter Barton, D.S.O., The King's African Rifles. (Nyasaland. Additional Member, in connection with military operations.)
- Brigadier-General Charles Macpherson Dobell, D.S.O., A.D.C., Inspector-General of the West African Frontier Force.(West Africa. Additional Member, in connection with military operations.)
- Captain Cyril Thomas Moulden Fuller, of His Majesty's Cruiser "Cumberland."(West Africa. Additional Member, in connection with military operations.)
- Charles Alfred Bell, Esq., of the Indian Civil Service, for services in connection with the Tibet Conference, 1913.
- Richard William Brant, Esq., lately Librarian and Keeper of the Papers, Foreign Office.

== Order of the Indian Empire ==
=== Knight Grand Commander (GCIE) ===
- Maharaja Sir Velugoti Sri Rajagopala Krishna Yachendralavarti Bahadur, K.C.I.E., Panchhazari Mansabdar, of Venkatagiri.
- Sir Sri Kantirava Narasinharaja Wadiyar Bahadur, K.C.I.E., Yuvaraja of Mysore.

=== Companion (CIE) ===
- Abdulla bin Esa, son of Sheikh Esa bin Ali al Khalifa, the Chief of Bahrein. (Honorary)
- The Reverend James Caruthers Rhea Ewing, D.D., LL.D., M.A., Principal of the Forman Christian College, Lahore, Punjab. (Honorary)
- Claude Dundas James Carmichael, Esq., Indian Police, Deputy Inspector-General of Police, Madras.
- Meherali Fazulbhoy Chinoy, Sheriff of Bombay, and an Additional Member of the Council of the Governor for making Laws and Regulations.
- Kiran Chandra De, Esq., B.A., Indian Civil Service, Magistrate and Collector, Bengal.
- Frank Willington Carter, Esq.
- Charles Montague King, Esq., Indian Civil Service, Deputy Commissioner of Amritsar, Punjab.
- Khan Bahadur Sheikh Riaz Hussein, Honorary Extra Assistant Commissioner and Magistrate of Multan, Punjab.
- Edward Rawson Gardiner, Esq., Indian Public Works Department, Chief Engineer and Secretary to the Government of Bihar and Orissa, and a Member of the Council of the Lieutenant-Governor for making Laws and Regulations.
- George Thomas Barlow, Esq., Superintending Engineer, Irrigation Branch, Public Works Department, United Provinces.
- Frederick Samuel Philip Swann, Esq., Indian Civil Service, Magistrate and Collector, Banda, United Provinces.
- Berkeley John Byng Stephens, Esq., a Member of the Council of the Lieutenant-Governor of Burma for making Laws and Regulations.
- Mir Kamal Khan, Jam of Las Bela, Kalat, Baluchistan.
- Captain Walter Lumsden, C.V.O., R.N. (retired), Director of the Royal Indian Marine.
- Colonel Dewan Bishan Das, Military Secretary to the Commander-in-Chief, Jammu and Kashmir State.
- Mager Frederic Gauntlett, Esq., Indian Civil Service, lately Comptroller and Auditor-General.
- Major Samuel Richard Christophers, M.B., Indian Medical Service, Officer in Charge of the Malarial Bureau at the Central Research Institute, Kasauli.
- Colonel George William Patrick Dennys, Indian Medical Service, Inspector-General of Civil Hospitals, Central Provinces, and a Member of the Council of the Chief Commissioner for making Laws and Regulations.
- William Peter Sangster, Esq., Indian Public Works Department, Executive Engineer, Malakand Division, Upper Swat River Canal, North-West Frontier Province.
- Captain William Henry Irvine Shakespear, Indian Army, Political Department, lately Political Agent, Koweit, Persian Gulf.
- Montague Hill, Esq., Indian Forest Department, Chief Conservator of Forests, Central Provinces, and lately Officiating Inspector-General of Forests.
- Captain Frederick Marshman Bailey, Indian Army, Political Department.
- Sahibzada Abdus Samad Khan, Chief Secretary to His Highness the Nawab of Rampur, United Provinces.

== Royal Victorian Order ==
=== Knight Grand Cross (GCVO) ===
- His Highness Prince Leopold Arthur Louis of Battenberg, K.C.V.O.

=== Commander (CVO) ===
- Major Clive Wigram, C.S.I., M.V.O., Assistant Private Secretary and Equerry in Waiting to His Majesty.
- John Marnoch, Esq., Regius Professor of Surgery, Aberdeen University.

=== Member, 5th Class ===
- Carpenter Lieutenant John William Sheldrake, Royal Navy. On promotion from His Majesty's yacht "Victoria and Albert." (Dated 1 October 1914.)

== Imperial Service Order (ISO) ==
Home Civil Service

- Walter Matthew Gibson, Esq., M.V.O., Secretary of His Majesty's Privy Purse.

== Edward Medal ==
- James Kennedy, of the Earnoch Colliery, Lanark.
- Joseph Cook, of the Blackhouse Colliery, Durham.

== King's Police Medal (KPM) ==
England and Wales

Police Forces

- Major Otway Mayne, Chief Constable of Buckinghamshire.
- Lieutenant-Colonel Llewellyn William Atcherley, M.V.O., Chief Constable of West Yorkshire
- Dr. J. B. Wright, Chief Constable of the Newcastle upon Tyne City Police and Director of the Fire Brigade.
- John Stirling, Head Constable of the Great Grimsby Borough Police.
- James A. P. Powell, Superintendent, Metropolitan Police.
- William Harrison, Superintendent and Deputy Chief Constable, Gloucestershire Constabulary.
- John Gleed, Superintendent and Chief Clerk, Warwickshire Constabulary.
- Horace Ellis, Superintendent and Deputy Chief Constable, West Sussex Constabulary.
- John Thomas Pearman, Superintendent, 1 Buckinghamshire Constabulary.
- Robert Faulkner, Superintendent and Deputy Chief Constable, Derbyshire Constabulary.
- Henry Warner, Superintendent, Ipswich Borough Police.
- William Gabriel Hooper, Superintendent, Northamptonshire Constabulary.
- James Barnes, Chief Superintendent and Chief Clerk, Lancashire Constabulary.
- Henry Wakeford, Superintendent, Hampshire Constabulary.
- Sidney Burfield, Sergeant, Metropolitan Police.
- Frederick Brown, George Roberts, Thomas Wright, Henry Brown, John Walker, Frederick West, Constables, Metropolitan Police.
- Joseph Greedy, Constable, Somersetshire Constabulary.
- Edwin Lawty, Constable, Guildford Borough Police.
- William Wiltshire, Constable, Wolverhampton Borough Police.

Fire Brigades

- Alexander Wall Weir, Chief Superintendent, Liverpool City Police.
- J. Franklin, Station Officer, London Fire Brigade.
- Harry Darkins, Fireman, London Fire Brigade.

Scotland

- James Tennant Gordon, Chief Constable of Fifeshire and Kinross-shire.
- John Millar, Chief Constable, Hamilton Burgh Police.
- John Morrison, Superintendent and Deputy Chief Constable, Lanarkshire Constabulary.
- David Pennie, Superintendent, Lanarkshire Constabulary.
- George Macaulay, ex-Superintendent, Edinburgh City Police.
- Alexander Harper, Superintendent, Glasgow City Police.

Ireland

- Colonel Sir Neville Francis Fitzgerald Chamberlain, K.C.B., K.C.V.O., Inspector-General, Royal Irish Constabulary.
- Thomas James Smith, Commissioner of Police, Belfast.
- John Patrick Fogarty, Head Constable Major, Royal Irish Constabulary Depot, Dublin.

India

- Claude Dundas James Carmichael, Deputy Inspector-General of Police, first grade, Madras Police.
- Daniel Reilly, Sergeant, first grade, Madras Police.
- Lawrence Edward Saunders, Assistant Superintendent of Police, second grade, Madras Police.
- Murid Ismail, Sowar, Palanpur Agency Police, Bombay Police.
- Ernest Edward Morris, Inspector, Criminal Investigation Department, Bombay City Police.
- Harry Officer Moore, Assistant Superintendent, second grade, Bombay Police.
- Hector Ratanji Kothawalla, Deputy Superintendent, second grade, Bombay District Police.
- Thomas Charles Greenop, Chief Officer of the Fire Brigade of the Bombay Municipality.
- Khan Saheb Kamruddin Abdul Rehman, Inspector, second grade, Bombay District Police.
- Robert Pryde, Inspector in the mounted branch of the Kathiawar Agency Police, Bombay Police.
- Cecil Ward Chichele Plowden, C.I.E., officiating Inspector-General of Police, Bengal.
- Elahi Bux, Inspector, Constables' Training School, Rajshahi, Bengal Police.
- Thomas Boyles, Inspector, second grade, Bengal Police.
- Rai Sahib Jogesh Chandra Bhowmik, officiating Deputy Superintendent of Police, Murshidabad, Bengal Police.
- Babu Basanta Kumar Chatarji, officiating Deputy Superintendent, Criminal Investigation Department, Bengal Police.
- Montague Lewis Oakes, Superintendent, second grade, United Provinces Police.
- Bhikam Singh, Constable, Civil Police, Lucknow district. United Provinces Police.
- Ramzan Ali, Sub-Inspector, United Provinces Police.
- Charles Stead, M.V.O., Superintendent and Personal Assistant to the Inspector-General of Police, Punjab Police.
- Godfrey Hugh Prickard, Superintendent, Punjab Police.
- Miran Baksh, Sub-Inspector, Punjab Police.
- Feroze Khan, Sub-Inspector, Punjab Police.
- Percy Frederic de la Feuillade Sherman, District Superintendent, third grade, Burma Police.
- Kenneth Campbell Macdonald, District Superintendent, third grade, Burma Police.
- William Wentworth Forbes, District Superintendent, second grade, Burma Police.
- Dhandraj, Constable, Rangoon Town Police.
- Robert Thomas Dundas, officiating Inspector-General of Police, Bihar and Orissa Police.
- Rai Bahadur Janki Prasad Tiwari, District Superintendent (retired), Bihar and Orissa Police.
- Jeodhari Singh, Constable, Bihar and Orissa Police.
- Herbert Spence, Deputy Inspector-General of Police, Eastern Kange, Central Provinces Police.
- Abbas Ali, Constable, Seoni District Police, Central Provinces Police.
- Jarnaluddin, Subadar-Major, Naga Hills Battalion, Assam Military Police.
- Hari Ram, Jemadar, Naga Hills Battalion, Assam Military Police.
- Norman Thomas Duncan, Assistant Superintendent of Police, first grade, District Officer, North-West Frontier Constabulary.
- Khan Bahadur Hafiz Zain ul-Abdin Khan, Deputy Superintendent, third grade, North-West Frontier Police.
- Abdul Rahim, Inspector, fourth grade, North-West Frontier Police.
- Ganga Singh, Inspector, Baluchistan Police.

Colonial Forces

- Nicholas Power, late Chief of Police, City of Halifax, Nova Scotia.
- Hedley John Rowney, Constable, South Australia Police.
- John Sullivan, Inspector-General of Constabulary, Newfoundland.
- Lieutenant-Colonel Edward Bell, Chief Inspector of the Leeward Islands Police.

== Distinguished Service Order (DSO) ==
- Major Arthur Harwood French, Royal Marine Light Infantry, Royal Marine Brigade, Royal Naval Division.
- Engineer Lieutenant-Commander Edward Hickman Tucker Meeson, His Majesty's Ship " Laurel."
- Lieutenant-Commander Edmund Laurence Braithwaite Lockyer, His Majesty's Ship " Carmania."
- Squadron Commander Edward Featherstone Briggs, Royal Naval Air Service.
- Flight Commander John Tremayne Babington, Royal Naval Air Service.
- Flight Lieutenant Sidney Vincent Sippe, Royal Naval Air Service.
- Captain The Honourable Herbrand Charles Alexander, 5th (Royal Irish) Lancers.
- Major Alexander George Arbuthnot, 24th Battery, Royal Field Artillery.
- Lieutenant John Dopping Boyd, 1st Battalion, The Queen's (Royal West Surrey Regiment).
- Captain Cyril Darcy Vivien Cary-Barnard, 2nd Battalion, The Duke of Edinburgh's (Wiltshire Regiment).
- Second Lieutenant Francis Graham, 51st Battery, Royal Field Artillery.
- Lieutenant The Honourable Julian Henry Francis Grenfell, 1st (Royal) Dragoons.
- The Reverend Percy Wyndham Guinness, B.A., Chaplain to the Forces, 3rd Cavalry Brigade.
- Second Lieutenant Richard Lambart, Intelligence Corps.
- Lieutenant (Temporary Captain) Donald Swain Lewis, Royal Engineers and Royal Flying Corps.
- Lieutenant Noel Yvon Loftus Welman, 1st Battalion, The Duke of Cambridge's Own (Middlesex Regiment).
- Captain Gerald Charles Balfour Buckland, 2nd Battalion, 8th Gurkha Rifles.
- Captain Robert Foster Dill, 129th Duke of Connaught's Own Baluchis.
- Captain Lionel Douglas Vernon, 37th Battery, Royal Field Artillery.

== Distinguished Service Cross (DSC) ==
- Lieutenant George Lionel Davidson, late His Majesty's Ship " Loyal,"
- Lieutenant Gerald Gordon Grant, Royal Naval Volunteer Reserve, Royal Naval Division.
- Sub-Lieutenant Charles Oscar Frittriof Modin, Royal Naval Volunteer Reserve, Royal Naval Division.
- Lieutenant David James Gowney, Royal Marine Light Infantry, Royal Marine Brigade, Royal Naval Division.
- Lieutenant Harold Owen Joyce, late His Majesty's Ship "Vestal."
- Lieutenant Douglas Reid Kinnier, Royal Naval Reserve, S..S. " Ortega."

== Distinguished Service Medal (DSM) ==
Naval Brigade

- Chief Petty Officer Bernard Henry Ellis, No. 748, B.Co., R.N.V.R., London.
- Chief Petty Officer Payne, D.Co.
- Petty Officer William Wallace, O.N., Dev. 211130.
- Stoker Petty Officer William Stephen Cole, O.N., Ch. 101113.
- Leading Seaman (Acting) Henry Lowe, R.N.R., Dev., No.. B. 2542.
- Ordinary Seaman George Ripley, new army recruit, C.Co. (now R.N.V.R.), K.W./755.
- Ordinary Seaman T. Machen, new array recruit, C.Co. (now R.N.V.R.).

Royal Marine Brigade

- R.F.R. Ch. 661. Serjeant-Major (Acting) James Thomas Galliford, R.M.L.I.
- R.F.R. Oh. 426. Quartermaster - Serjeant George James Kenny, R.M.L.I.
- R.F.R. Ch. 631. Serjeant Gideon Harry Bruce, R.M.L.I.
- Ch. 18717. Lance-Corporal Thomas Charles Franks, R.M.L.I.
- Ply. 7685. Lance-Corporal Walter John Cook, R.M.L.I.
- R.F.R. Ch. 194. Private George Henry Hall, R.M.L.I.
- R.F.R. Ch. 1585. Private Charles Joseph Fleet, R.M.L.I.
- Ch. 18446. Private Stuart Lang, R.M.L.I.
- Senior Reserve Attendant Edmund Walch, Royal Naval Auxiliary Sick Berth Reserve, O.N., M. 9522.

For the operations off the Belgian Coast from 17 October to 9 November: —

- " Falcon." Petty Officer Robert Chappell, O.N., 207788 (since died of wounds received in action).
- " Falcon." Petty Officer Frederick William Georgeson Motteram, O.N., 183216.
- " Brilliant." Leading Seaman John Thomas Knott, O.N., J. 1186.
- "Falcon." Able Seaman Ernest Dimmock, O.N., 204549.
- " Mersey." Boy, 1st Class, Herbert Edward Sturman, O.N., J. 24887.

For service in the Dardanelles in Submarine " B.ll " on 13 December:— .

- Petty Officer William Charles Milsom, O.N., 182452.
- Petty Officer Tomas Henry Davey, O.N., 215464.
- Chief Engine Room Artificer, 2nd Class, John Harding, O.N., 270410.
- Engine Room Artificer, 1st Class, Anthony Douglas, O.N., 270773.
- Stoker Petty Officer Patrick McKenna, O.N., 284570.
- Leading Seaman Alfred Edmund Perry, O.N., 234677.
- Leading Seaman Wilfrid Charles Mortimer, O.N., 219476.
- Able Seaman Norman Lester Rae, O.N., 232229.
- Able Seaman George Read, O.N., 231010.
- Able Seaman Edward Buckle, O.N., 237869.
- Able Seaman Tom Blake, O.N., J. 1383.
- Signalman Frederick George Foote, O.N., J. 1862.
- Acting Leading Stoker John Henry Sowden, O.N., 308448.
- Stoker, 1st Class, Stephen James Lovelady, O.N., K. 2240.

== Military Cross (MC) ==
- Lieutenant G. F. H. Brooke, 16th Lancers (Staff Captain).
- Lieutenant (temporary Captain) A. H. L. Soames, 3rd Hussars (Flight Commander, Royal Flying Corps, Military Wing).
- Lieutenant (temporary Captain in Army) C. W. Wilson, Royal Flying Corps, Special Reserve.
- Lieutenant (temporary Captain in Army) E. L. Conran, 2nd County of London Yeomanry (Flight Commander, Royal Flying Corps, Military Wing).
- Lieutenant A. L. E. Smith, 1st Life Guards.
- Second Lieutenant C. Pooley, 5th Dragoon Guards.
- Lieutenant G. F. A. Pigot-Moodie, 2nd Dragoons.
- Captain E. H. L. Beddington, 16th Lancers.
- Lieutenant G.W. Gore-Langton, 18th Hussars.
- Second Lieutenant R. Y. K. Walker, Royal Horse Artillery.
- Captain F. L. Congreve, Royal Field Artillery.
- Captain A. G. Gillman, Royal Field Artillery.
- Captain D. D. Rose, Royal Field Artillery.
- Captain D. R. Macdonald, Royal Field Artillery.
- Lieutenant J. E. L. Clarke, Royal Field Artillery (deceased).
- Lieutenant G. E. W. Franklyn, Royal Field Artillery.
- Lieutenant A. R. Rainy, Royal Field Artillery.
- Lieutenant P. E. Inchbald, Royal Field Artillery.
- Lieutenant (temporary) R. R. W. Bell, Royal Field Artillery.
- Lieutenant F. McC. Douie, Royal Engineers (1st King George's Own Sappers and Miners).
- Second Lieutenant (temporary) C. Shergold, Royal Engineers.
- Quartermaster and Honorary Lieutenant G. F. W. Willicott, Royal Engineers.
- Captain Hon. W. A. Cecil, Grenadier Guards (deceased).
- Lieutenant Hon. H. W. Gough, Irish Guards.
- Captain T. J. Uzielli, Royal Lancaster Regiment.
- Captain G. 0. Sloper, Northumberland Fusiliers.
- Second Lieutenant E. W. Tyler, Royal Fusiliers
- Captain (temporary) G. C. Lyle, Norfolk Regiment.
- Captain (temporary) C. E. G. Shearman, Bedfordshire Regiment.
- Lieutenant F. H. L. Rushton, Royal Irish Regiment (deceased).
- Captain H. G. B. Miller, Royal Scots Fusiliers.
- Second Lieutenant W. F. Watkins, Gloucestershire Regiment, Special Reserve.
- Captain (temporary) S. A Gabb, Worcestershire Regiment.
- Quartermaster and Honorary Lieutenant G. E. Hyson, East Surrey Regiment.
- Lieutenant C. H. Woodhouse, Dorsetshire Regiment.
- Lieutenant B. V. Fulcher, South Lancashire Regiment (deceased).
- Captain G. B. Rowan-Hamilton, Royal Highlanders.
- Captain G. Blewitt, Oxfordshire and Buckinghamshire Light Infantry.
- Captain (temporary) G. C. Binsteed, Essex Regiment.
- Captain (temporary) E. J. W. Spread, Loyal North Lancashire Regiment.
- Captain G. St. G. Robinson, Northamptonshire Regiment.
- Second Lieutenant H. S. Doe, Royal West Kent Regiment.
- Captain R. H. Willan, King's Royal Rifle Corps (Army Signal Service).
- Lieutenant J. H. S. Dimmer, V.C., King's Royal Rifle Corps.
- Lieutenant J. S. Harper, Manchester Regiment.
- Captain A. P. D. Telfer-Smollett, Highland Light Infantry.
- Captain W. M. Thomson, Seaforth Highlanders.
- Lieutenant D. Cameron, Cameron Highlanders.
- Lieutenant (temporary) W.H. Liesching, Royal Irish Fusiliers.
- Lieutenant R. I. Thomas, Connaught Rangers (deceased).
- Second Lieutenant R. L. Spreckley, Connaught Rangers (deceased).
- Second Lieutenant W. Bruen, Connaught Rangers.
- Captain (temporary) T. J. Leahy, Royal Dublin Fusiliers.
- Lieutenant C. L. St. J. Tudor, Army Service Corps.
- Lieutenant C. W. R. Langmaid, Army Service Corps.
- Second Lieutenant C. J. Martin, Army Service Corps.
- Second Lieutenant M. Burke, Army Service Corps.
- Captain H. Stewart, M.B., Royal Army Medical Corps.
- Captain E. D. Caddell, M.B., Royal Army Medical Corps.
- Lieutenant C. Helm, Royal Army Medical Corps.
- Lieutenant (temporary) E. J. Wyler, M.D., Royal Army Medical Corps.
- Captain J. F. Murphy, M.B., Royal Army Medical Corps, Special Reserve.
- Lieutenant C. J. Cockburn, 6th Jat Light Infantry.
- Captain D. H. Acworth, 55th Coke's Rifles.
- Captain G. S. Bull, 58th Vaughan's Rifles.
- Captain J. R. L. Heyland, 9th Gurkha Rifles.
- Captain Kanwar Indarjit Singh, M.B., Indian Medical Service (deceased).
- Jemadar Inchha Ram, 6th Jat Light Infantry.
- Subadar Sant Singh, 34th Sikh Pioneers.
- Subadar Thakur Singh, 47th Sikhs.
- Subadar Zaman Khan, 129th Baluchis.
- Subadar Nain Sing Chinwarh, 39th Garhwal Rifles.
- Serjeant-Major D. S. Jillings, Royal Flying Corps (Military Wing).
- Serjeant-Major J. Ramsay, Royal Flying Corps (Military Wing).
- Serjeant-Major E. J. Parker, Royal Flying Corps (Military Wing).
- Serjeant-Major E. Ludlow, Grenadier Guards.
- Serjeant-Major J. A. Danoey, Coldstream Guards.
- Serjeant-Major T. S. Tate, Scots Guards.
- Serjeant-Major J. H. Martin, Royal Scots.
- Serjeant-Major E. Dakin, Royal Lancaster Regiment.
- Serjeant-Major T. Caddy, Liverpool Regiment.
- Serjeant-Major A. Stapleton, Lincolnshire Regiment.
- Serjeant-Major R. Burton, Suffolk Regiment.
- Serjeant-Major J. F. Plunkett, Royal Irish Regiment.
- Serjeant-Major N. MacWhinnie, King's Own Scottish Borderers (deceased).
- Serjeant-Major T. V. W. Roberts, South Lancashire Regiment.
- First Class Staff Serjeant-Major J. T. Main, Army Service Corps.
- Mechanist Serjeant-Major T. D. Hopper, Army Service Corps.
- Staff Serjeant-Major V. B. Walter, Army Service Corps.
- Staff Serjeant-Major S. J. Webster, Army Service Corps.
- Mechanist Serjeant-Major B. W. Nicholson, Army Service Corps.
- Staff Serjeant-Major W. Taylor, Army Service Corps.
- Staff Serjeant-Major B. W. Badcock, Army Service Corps.
- Serjeant-Major R. Cox, Royal Army Medical Corps.
- Serjeant-Major A. T. Hasler, Royal Army Medical Corps.
- Serjeant-Major T. E. Coggon, Royal Army Medical Corps.
- Serjeant-Major B.. J. Anderson, Royal Army Medical Corps.
- Serjeant-Major E. R. Loft, Royal Army Medical Corps.
- Serjeant-Major R. J. McKay, Royal Army Medical Corps.

== Order of British India ==
First Class with the title of Sardar Bahadur

- Risaldar Khwaja Muhammad Khan Bahadur, I.D.S.M., A.D.C., Order of British India, Second Class, Queen Victoria's Own Corps of Guides (Frontier Force).

Second Class with the title of Bahadur

- Subadar Arsla Khan, I.O.M., 57th Wilde's Rifles (Frontier Force).
- Subadar Balbahadur Khattri, 1st Battalion, 9th Gurkha Rifles.
- Subadar-Major Fateh Sing Newar, 2nd Battalion, 2nd King Edward's Own Gurkha Rifles (The Sirmoor Rifles).
- Subadar Jagat Sing Rawat, I.O.M., 1st Battalion, 39th Garhwal Rifles.
- Subadar-Major Abdul Ali, 58th Rifles (Frontier Force).

== Indian Order of Merit (IOM) ==
Second Class

- Naik Sar Amir.
- Colour-Havildar Ghulam Mahomed.
- Lanoe-Naik Said Akbar.
- Havildar Yakub Khan.
- Sepoy Daulat Khan.
- Sepoy Usman Khan.
- Senior Sub-Assistant Surgeon Pandit Shanker Dass.
- Lance-Naik Biaz Gul.
- Sepoy Zarif Khan.
- Naik Padamdhoj Gurung.
- Lance-Naik Jaman Sing Rana.
- Lance-Naik Jaman Sing Khattri.
- Rifleman Kalamu Bisht.
- Lance-Naik Sankaru Gusain.
- Havildar Alam Sing Negi.
- Rifleman Ganesh Singh Sajwan.
- Havildar Karam Singh.
- Havildar Hari Persad Thapa.
- Sub-Assistant Surgeon Harnam Singh
- Havildar Nikka Singh.
- Sapper Dalip Singh.
- Jemadar Ram Rup Singh.
- Ward Orderly Madhu

== Distinguished Conduct Medal (DCM) ==
- Acting Serjeant Ashby, E., 2nd Battalion, Oxfordshire and Buckinghamshire Light Infantry.
- Corporal Askew, W. J., 2nd Battalion, Coldstream Guards.
- Acting Corporal Badcock, G., 1st Battalion, Royal Berkshire Regiment.
- Company Serjeant-Major Bailey, 1st Battalion, Loyal North Lancashire Regiment.
- Serjeant Baillie, W ., 2nd Battalion, Highland Light Infantry.
- Corporal Baker, D. G., 5th Lancers.
- Acting Corporal Baldwin, R., 2nd Battalion, Worcestershire Regiment.
- Private Banner, J. W., 2nd Battalion; Worcestershire Regiment.
- Private Barclay, 1st Battalion, Scottish Rifles.
- Private Barnett, L., 2nd Battalion, Coldstream Guards.
- Serjeant Barnfield, J. L., Royal Army Medical Corps (Field Ambulance) (S.R.).
- Corporal Barry, F., 59th Field Company, Royal Engineers.
- Acting Company Quartermaster-Serjeant Barton, J., 2nd Battalion, Essex Regiment.
- Private Beale, A., 2nd Battalion, Royal Sussex Regiment.
- Serjeant Bennett, 2nd Battalion, Leinster Regiment.
- Driver Bianchi, F., 23rd Field Company, Royal Engineers.
- Private Black, R., 1st Battalion, South Wales Borderers.
- Serjeant Blakemore, W. G., 1st Battalion, Scottish Rifles.
- Private Booth, C. H., 3rd Battalion, Coldstream Guards.
- Corporal Bradford, W ., 2nd Battalion, Highland Light Infantry.
- Company Serjeant-Major Bradish, A., 2nd Battalion, Worcestershire Regiment.
- Squadron Serjeant-Major Cordwell, C. E., 3rd Dragoon Guards.
- Private Carrington, R. H ., 1st Battalion, Leicestershire Regiment.
- Corporal Chambers, A. G., 5th Field Company, Royal Engineers.
- Serjeant Clark, E. J., 15th Hussars.
- Private Clark, J ., 1st Battalion, Shropshire Light Infantry.
- Private Clarkson, J., 1st Battalion, Leicestershire Regiment.
- Second Corporal Clifford, F. W., 3rd Section, 2nd Signal Company, Royal Engineers.
- Private Clifford, 2nd Battalion, Leinster Regiment.
- Private Cline, J. R., 6th Dragoon Guards.
- Serjeant Cobb, A. J., 5th Lancers.
- Private Coe, G. H., 3rd Battalion, Coldstream Guards.
- Lance-Corporal Colgrave, J., 5th Lancers.
- Serjeant Cox, B.L., 1st Battalion, Dorsetshire Regiment.
- Corporal Cremetti, M. A. E., 4th Signal Troop, Royal Engineers.
- Bombardier Crompton, W. J., 71st Battery, Royal Field Artillery.
- Lance-Corporal Curtis, W. J., 5th Field Company, Royal Engineers.
- Serjeant Curzon, H., 2nd Battalion, King's Royal Rifle Corps.
- Corporal Cyster, P. G., 1st Battalion, Bedfordshire Regiment.
- Gunner Davidson, J. C., 71st Battery. Royal Field Artillery.
- Acting Corporal Day, H., 1st Battalion, Royal Berkshire Regiment.
- Lance-Corporal Delaney, W., 1st Battalion, Irish Guards.
- Corporal Dickinson, E., 1st Royal Dragoons.
- Sapper Duckett, A., 5th Field Company, Royal Engineers.
- Acting Company Serjeant-Major Durrans, W. B., 1st Battalion, Lincolnshire Regiment.
- Private Edom, R., 1st Battalion, Scots Guards.
- Serjeant Edwards, B. P., 12th Lancers.
- Lance-Corporal Edwards, E ., 1st Battalion, Loyal North Lancashire Regiment.
- Acting Serjeant Edwards, H., 2nd Battalion, Oxfordshire and Buckinghamshire Light Infantry.
- Serjeant-Major Elliott, C. J. M., 1st Royal West Surrey Regiment.
- Serjeant Ellis, G., 2nd Battalion, Worcestershire Regiment.
- Acting Corporal Enticott, J., 3rd Hussars.
- Private (Acting Corporal) Flowers, E. W., Army Service Corps.
- Serjeant Forwood, H., 3rd Battalion, East Kent Regiment.
- Acting Squadron Serjeant-Major Frane, T., 11th Hussars.
- Acting Squadron Serjeant-Major Fraser, J. H., 2nd Dragoon Guards.
- Bandsman Frere, T., 3rd Hussars.
- Corporal Goodman, J., 2nd Battalion, King's Royal Rifle Corps.
- Private Gratton, E. H., 1st Battalion, Leicestershire Regiment.
- Acting Serjeant-Major Grant, 1st Battalion, Royal Lancaster Regiment.
- Private Grogan, A., 1st Battalion, Leicestershire Regiment.
- Private Gudgeon, C. W., 1st Battalion, Northamptonshire Regiment.
- Sapper Guinan, W., 59th Field Company, Royal Engineers.
- Private Gunter, H., 1st Battalion, South Wales Borderers.
- Private Hallamore, H ., Royal Army Medical Corps.
- Private Harford, C., 15th Hussars.
- Corporal Harper, A ., 1st Dragoon Guards.
- Serjeant Harradine, C., 1st Battalion, Irish Guards.
- Acting Serjeant Harris, R. T., 1st Battalion, Middlesex Regiment.
- Private Harris, E., 1st Battalion, Royal Berkshire Regiment.
- Serjeant Harris, T., 5th Field Company. Royal Engineers.
- Staff Quartermaster-Serjeant Harri- son, G., Army Service Corps.
- Serjeant (Acting Company Quarter- master-Serjeant) Harvey, A., 2nd Battalion, West Riding Regiment.
- Lance-Corporal Hill, F. C. G., 1st Royal Berkshire Regiment.
- Corporal Hodder, H. G., No. Reserve Signal Company, Royal Engineers.
- Second Corporal Hodgson, T., 26th. Field Company, Royal Engineers.
- Serjeant Holness, H. H. J., 2nd Battalion, Grenadier Guards.
- Private Holroyd, F. J., Royal Army Medical Corps.
- Bandsman Hodson, A. R., 3rd Hussars.
- Corporal Honnes, H., 48th Battery, Royal Field Artillery.
- Regimental Corporal-Major Howard, F., 2nd Life Guards.
- Acting Serjeant Hubbard, T., 1st Battalion, Lincolnshire Regiment.
- Private John, G. W., 2nd Battalion, Welsh Regiment.
- Private Jones, E., 2nd Battalion, Monmouthshire Regiment.
- Private Jones, W., 1st Liverpool Regiment.
- Serjeant Joseph, A. E., Royal Army Medical Corps (S.R.).
- Private Joynt, F ., 1st Battalion, King's Royal Rifle Corps.
- Acting Serjeant Kemp, A. E., 2nd Battalion, Worcestershire Regiment.
- Serjeant Kirkcaldy, J ., 26th (Heavy), Battery, Royal Garrison Artillery.
- Private Knight, F. A., 2nd Battalion, Coldstream Guards.
- Company Serjeant-Major Laking, H .,1st Battalion, West Yorkshire Regiment.
- Bombardier Lamb, W. E., 48th Battery, Royal Field Artillery.
- Serjeant Leddington, T., 2nd Battalion, Royal Welsh Fusiliers.
- Company Serjeant-Major Lewington, J.,. 3rd Battalion, West Yorkshire Regiment.
- Lance-Corporal Lister, W ., 3rd Dragoon Guards.
- Private Lively, C. E., 2nd Battalion, Worcestershire Regiment.
- Lance-Corporal Lock, F., 1st Battalion, King's Royal Rifle Corps.
- Machine-Gun Serjeant Longden, E ., 2nd. Battalion, Welsh Regiment.
- Pioneer Loose, T., Royal Engineers (3rd Signal Company).
- Pioneer Lowry, W ., Reserve Signal. Company, Royal Engineers.
- Private Lucas, A. H., Royal Army Medical Corps.
- Private Lusty, A. E. E., 5th Dragoon Guards.
- Lance-Serjeant Mackay, W ., 15th Hussars.
- Serjeant McLellan, P. H ., 1st Royal Dragoons.
- Private Macredy, H., 2nd Dragoons.
- Lance-Corporal Marshall, G.M. 1st Battalion, Middlesex Regiment.
- Private Marshall, F ., Royal Army Medical Corps.
- Serjeant Mart, A. J ., 1st Battalion, Bedfordshire Regiment.
- Private Mathews, W. J., Royal Army Medical Corps, N. 2 Field Ambulance.
- Private Mills, R. H., Royal Army Medical Corps.
- Private Mitchell, A., list Battalion, Black Watch.
- Private Molloy, T., 2nd Battalion, Connaught Rangers.
- Private Moore, W., 1st Battalion, Irish Guards.
- Private Moore, W ., 1st Battalion, Shropshire Light Infantry.
- Acting Serjeant-Major Moraghan, M., 2nd Battalion, Connaught Rangers.
- Private Moir, D., 1st Royal Dragoons.
- Lance-Serjeant Moran, C., 1st Battalion, Irish Guards.
- Serjeant Moran, T., 1st Battalion, Black Watch.
- Private Morgan, H., 1st Liverpool Regiment.
- Corporal Morrison, J. S., No. 1 Signal Company, Royal Engineers.
- Private Murray, A., 2nd Battalion, Royal Inniskilling Fusiliers.
- Private Mutter, J., 2nd Dragoons.
- Private Neville, F., 15th Hussars.
- Lance-Corporal Newbery, F ., 1st Battalion, Somerset Light Infantry.
- Serjeant-Drummer Nice, W. W., 1st Battalion, Coldstream Guards.
- Serjeant Nisbet, J., 2nd Battalion, Highland Light Infantry.
- Battery Quartermaster - Serjeant Noakes, F ., " K " Battery, Royal Horse. Artillery.
- Acting Corporal Nilen, W ., 1st Battalion, Royal Berkshire Regiment.
- Serjeant Owins, D. M., 2nd Battalion, Worcestershire Regiment.
- Corporal Page, A. A., 4th Hussars.
- Company Quartermaster-Serjeant Pandfield, W. G., 2nd Battalion, Worcestershire Regiment.
- Serjeant Pardoe, J., 5th Battalion, Worcestershire Regiment.
- Private Parsons, C., 1st Liverpool Regiment.
- Lance-Corporal Parsons, L. H., 3rd Battalion, Coldstream Guards.
- Private Payne, B. W., 1st Dragoon Guards (attached to 1st Life Guards).
- Private Payne, F., Army Service Corps (S.R.).
- Private Pickstone, E., 3rd Hussars.
- Corporal Pinchin, E., 2nd Battalion, Monmouthshire Regiment.
- Corporal Pitman, F. J., 5th Field Company, Royal Engineers.
- Corporal Pond, L., 115th Battery, Royal Field Artillery.
- Corporal Pratt, H. W., 117th Battery, Royal Field Artillery.
- Acting Serjeant Pudney, P. A., 2nd Battalion, Essex Regiment.
- Corporal Pugh, M., 1st Battalion, South Wales Borderers.
- Private Pym, J., 1st Royal Berkshire Regiment.
- Private Ranger, H. J., Royal Army Medical Corps.
- Serjeant Redpath, R., 1st Battalion, Black Watch.
- Serjeant Richardson, C. C., 1st Battalion, Middlesex Regiment.
- Corporal of Horse Rose, A., 1st Life Guards.
- Quartermaster-Serjeant Rowe, A. R. R., 2nd Battalion, Sherwood Foresters.
- Lance-Corporal Royal, G., 1st Battalion, Gloucestershire Regiment.
- Private Royan, 2nd Battalion, Seaforth Highlanders.
- Private Savage, R., 10th Hussars.
- Lance-Corporal Seton, A.E ., 9th Lancers.
- Private Senior, J., 2nd Battalion, Coldstream Guards.
- Serjeant Sessions, A., 4th Dragoon Guards.
- Squadron Quartermaster - Serjeant Shakespeare, W., 18th Hussars (P.S. North Somerset Yeomanry).
- Corporal Shave, A. H., 117th Battery, Royal Field Artillery.
- Private Shaw, W. C., 1st Royal Dragoons.
- Lance-Corporal Sheale, R. G., 1st Signal Company, Royal Canadian Engineers.
- Lance-Serjeant Shields, J., 1st Battalion, Scots Guards.
- Private Shipway, J., 1st Battalion, Gloucestershire Regiment.
- Acting-Serjeant Siddons, W ., 4th Hussars.
- Serjeant-Major Simpson, T., 2nd Battalion, Highland Light Infantry.
- Private Simpson, W., 1st Battalion, Liverpool Regiment.
- Lance-Serjeant Small, E. J., 3rd Battalion, Coldstream Guards.
- Lance-Corporal Smart, A. H ., 5th Lancers.
- Lance-Corporal Smith, J., South Staffordshire Regiment.
- Serjeant Smith, J. H., 57th Battery, Royal Field Artillery.
- Acting-Corporal Spain, F ., 1st Battalion, Rifle Brigade.
- Driver Stratford, A., 117th Battery, Royal Field Artillery.
- Lance-Serjeant Sutton, F .,2nd Battalion, Worcestershire Regiment.
- Private Sweeny, J., 2nd Battalion, Connaught Rangers.
- Sapper Sycamore, L. A ., Royal Engineers.
- Lance-Corporal Tucker, A. A., 2nd Battalion, King's Royal Rifle Corps.
- Private Tyrrell, A. J., 2nd Battalion, Oxfordshire and Buckinghamshire Light Infantry.
- Sapper Vye, W. P., 5th Field Company, Royal Engineers.
- Private Wellings, H. W., 6th Dragoon Guards.
- Driver Wells, T., Army Service Corps.
- Company Serjeant-Major Whitley, B. F ., 2nd Battalion, King's Royal Rifle Corps.
- 2nd Corporal Wilkinson, A. A., 26th Field Company, Royal Engineers.
- Sapper Wilson, J., 5th Field Company, Royal Engineers.
- Acting Serjeant Winter, W., 1st Battalion, Royal Berkshire Regiment.
- Serjeant Woodland, W. G., 4th Dragoon Guards.
- Serjeant Woodward, F., Royal Army Medical Corps (attached'Royal Scots Greys).
- Lance-Corporal Wootton, W. H., 2nd Battalion, Durham Light Infantry.
