= Frederick Stephens (cricketer) =

English cricketer and British Army officer

Personal information
- Full name: Frederick Stephens
- Born: 4 February 1836; Caversham, Berkshire, England
- Died: 1 April 1909 (aged 73); Chawton, Hampshire, England
- Batting: Unknown
- Role: Wicket-keeper
- Relatives: Berkeley Stephens (son); John Byng (nephew); Arthur Byng (nephew)

Career statistics
| Competition | First-class |
|---|---|
| Matches | 1 |
| Runs scored | 9 |
| Batting average | 9.00 |
| 100s/50s | –/– |
| Top score | 9* |
| Catches/stumpings | –/– |
- Source: Cricinfo, 3 February 2022

Frederick Stephens JP (4 February 1836 — 1 April 1909) was an English first-class cricketer and British Army officer.

The son of John Stephens, he was born at Caversham in February 1836. He was educated at Winchester College, before matriculating to Pembroke College, Oxford. After graduating from Oxford, Stephens entered into the Life Guards as a cornet and sub-lieutenant by purchase in March 1861. He purchased the rank of lieutenant in the October of the same year, before purchasing the rank of captain in July 1864. Stephens played first-class cricket in 1865, making a single appearance for the Gentlemen of Marylebone Cricket Club against the Gentlemen of Kent at the Canterbury Cricket Week. Batting twice in the match, he made scores of 9 not out in the Gentlemen first innings, while in their second innings he was dismissed without scoring by William Jervis. Stephens retired from active service in November 1869. He was married to Cecilia Byng, the daughter of a Royal Navy captain, in January 1869. Stephens held the offices of justice of the peace for both Hampshire and Huntingdonshire. He died in Hampshire at Chawton in April 1909. His son, Berkeley, was also a first-class cricketer, as were his nephew's John Byng and Arthur Byng.
