= Reginald Marix =

Royal Air Force Air Vice-Marshal (1889–1966)

Reginald Leonard George Marix
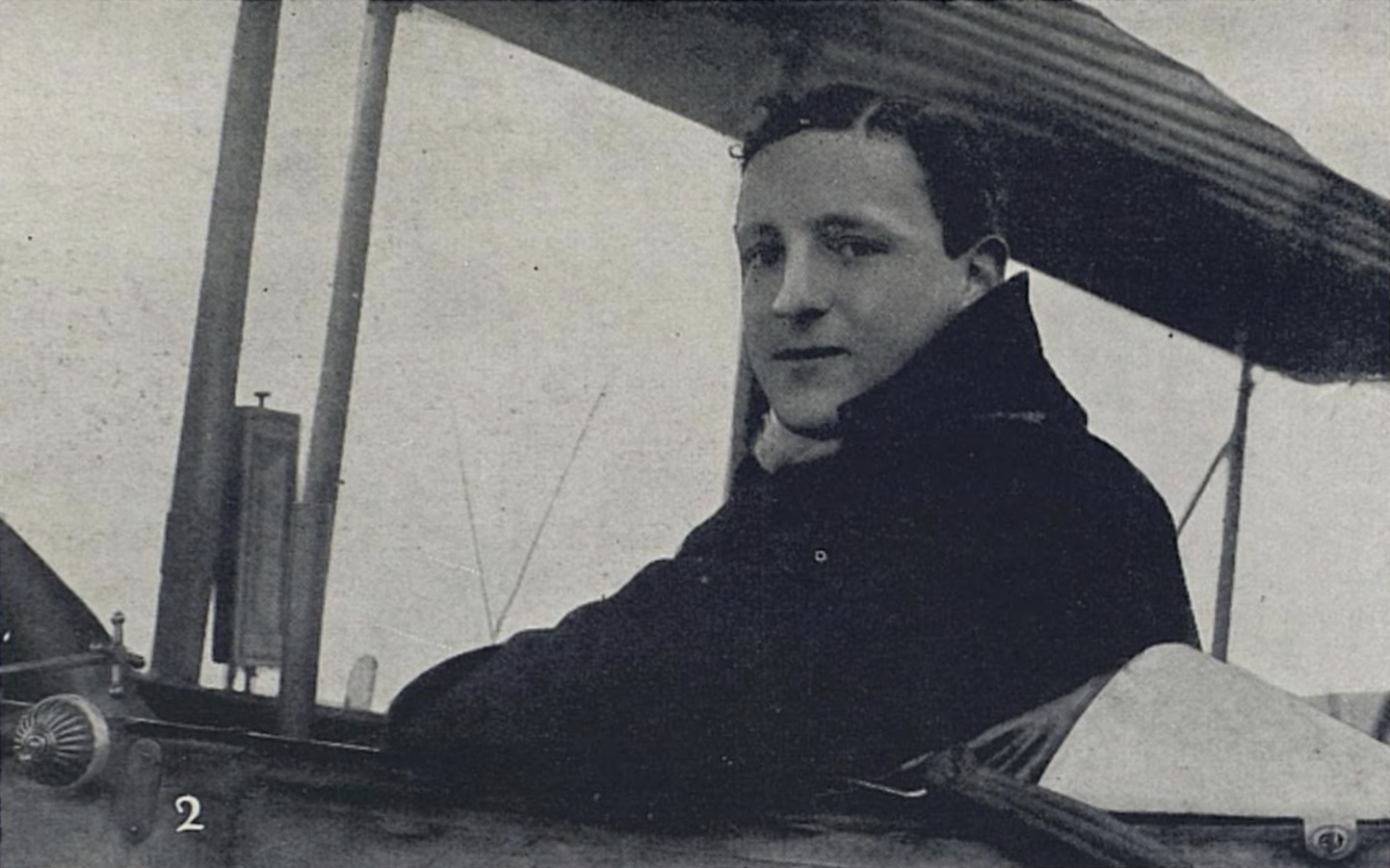
- Reginald Marix (The Illustrated War News, 1914)
- Born: 17 August 1889; Kensington, England
- Died: 7 January 1966 (aged 76); Majorca, Spain
- Military career
- Allegiance: United Kingdom
- Branch: Royal Navy (1909–18); Royal Air Force (1918–45)
- Service years: 1909–1945
- Rank: Air Vice Marshal
- Nickname: Reggie
- Commands: No. 45 Group (1943–45); No. 18 Group (1941–42); No. 16 Group (1939–40); RAF Hal Far (1934–36); RAF Kalafrana (1932–34, 1936)
- Conflicts: First World War; Western Front; Gallipoli campaign; Second World War
- Awards: Companion of the Order of the Bath; Distinguished Service Order; Mentioned in Despatches (3); Knight of the Order of the Crown (Belgium); Croix de Guerre (Belgium); Commander's Cross with Star of the Order of Polonia Restituta (Poland)

Air Vice Marshal Reginald Leonard George Marix, CB, DSO (17 August 1889 – 7 January 1966) was a British aviator, originally with the Royal Naval Air Service, who later reached air officer rank in the Royal Air Force. He is credited with being the first pilot to destroy a Zeppelin, when in October 1914 he bombed the airship sheds at Düsseldorf. A flying accident in 1916 ended his flying career, but he remained in the Royal Air Force, serving in various staff positions, and during the Second World War commanded two reconnaissance groups, and from 1943 to 1945 the group responsible for ferrying aircraft from North America to Europe.

== Early life and flying career ==
Marix was born on 17 August 1889 in Kensington, London, and educated at Radley College and the Sorbonne, Paris. In 1909 he joined the Royal Naval Volunteer Reserve, rising to the rank of leading seaman, before being commissioned as a sub-lieutenant in the Royal Naval Reserve on 1 November 1912, and posted to HMS Actaeon to attend the flying course. Marix learned to fly at the Bristol School on Salisbury Plain, where he was awarded Royal Aero Club Aviators' Certificate No. 403 on 14 January 1913, after soloing a Bristol Boxkite. He was then transferred to the Central Flying School at Upavon for further instruction, being appointed a flying officer and posted to the Naval Flying School at RNAS Eastchurch on 17 April. The aircraft at Eastchurch, under Commander Charles Rumney Samson, formed the Naval Wing of the Royal Flying Corps and flew a variety of aircraft, including Shorts, Blériots, Deperdussins, Avros, Sopwiths, and Farmans. On 17 April 1914 Marix was promoted to lieutenant, and on 1 July was appointed a flight lieutenant in the Royal Naval Air Service, which was founded on that day.

== First World War ==
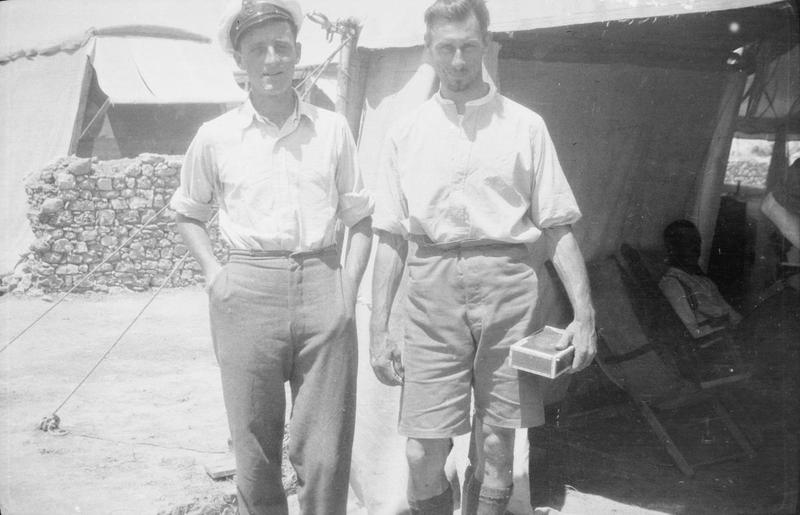
Flight Commanders Marix (left) and Thomson (right) at Tenedos, Gallipoli, July 1915.

On 4 August 1914 Britain declared war on Germany, and three RNAS squadrons were soon deployed to Belgium and France primarily to fly reconnaissance missions, but also found themselves operating armoured cars. In early September an RNAS unit, comprising six aircraft from three squadrons was sent to Wilrijk aerodrome in Antwerp. Under the orders of Winston Churchill, the First Lord of the Admiralty, it was tasked with mounting the first long-distance bombing raids on Germany. Their targets were the airship sheds at Düsseldorf and Cologne, in order to forestall Zeppelin raids on England. For the first mission on 22 September, Baron Pierre de Caters provided a force of Belgian armoured cars which was sent out to create and defend a forward landing strip west of the Meuse, as the British aircraft did not have sufficient range to fly directly to their targets and back. The raid was commanded by Squadron Commander Eugene Gerrard, who with Flight Lieutenant Marix, headed for Cologne, while Squadron Commander Spenser Grey and Lieutenant Charles Collet flew to Düsseldorf. Their Sopwith aircraft had no fixed machine-guns, the pilots being armed only with revolvers, and carried only two or four 20-pound (9 kg) Hales bombs. By the time the four aircraft crossed the River Roer, fog obscured the ground and Collet was the only pilot to find his target, the airship shed at Düsseldorf. He dropped his bombs from a low level, but only one hit the shed, and it failed to explode.

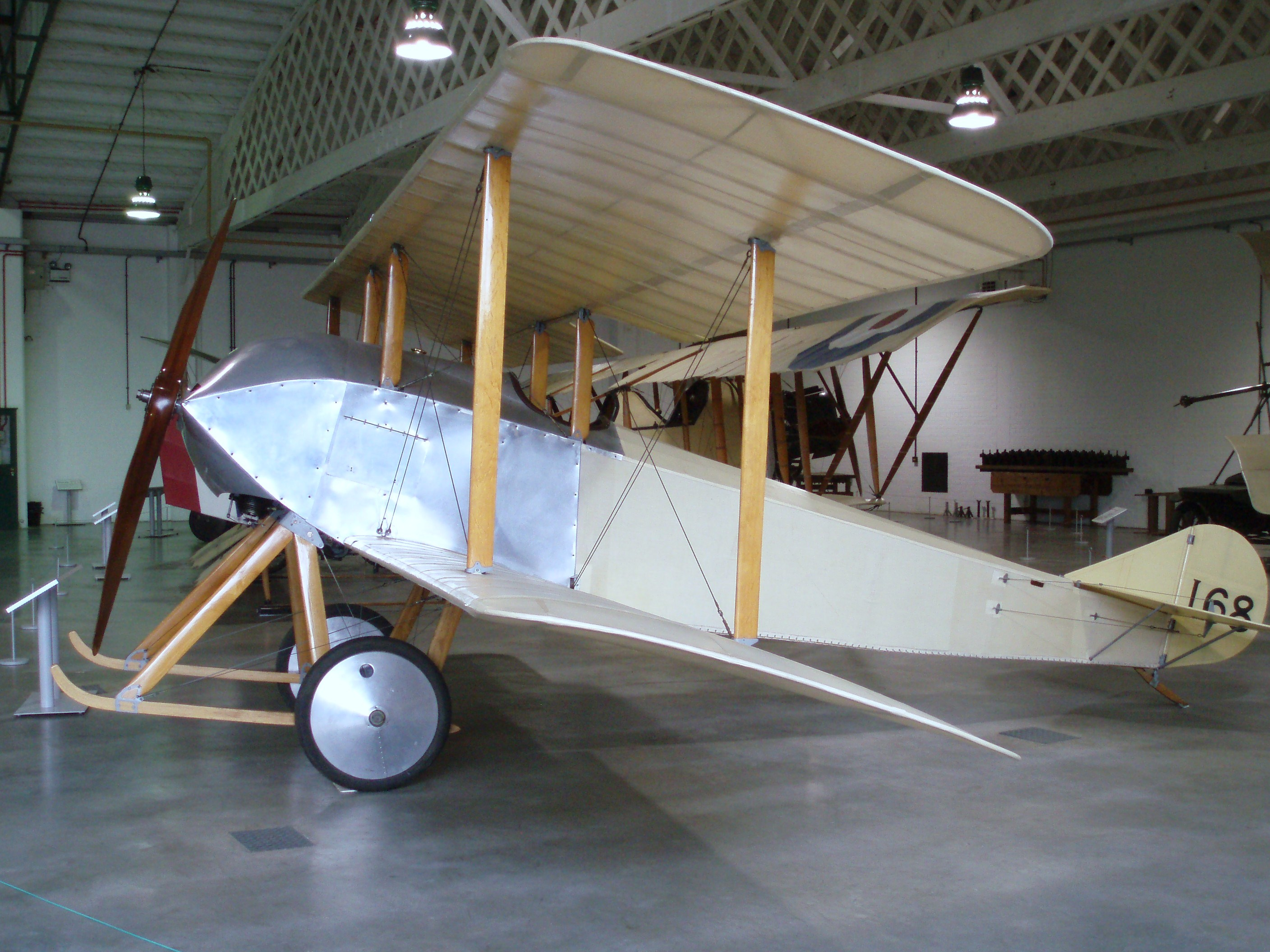
Replica of the Sopwith Tabloid (No. 168) in which Marix bombed the airship hangar at Düsseldorf, Stow Maries Great War Aerodrome (www.Stowmaries.org.uk).

On 28 September Antwerp came under attack by German heavy guns, and the RNAS aircraft assisted the Belgian defenders by flying artillery spotting missions. However, by early October, with the fall of the city seemingly inevitable, most of the RNAS unit was evacuated. On 8 October Grey and Marix took off in two Sopwith Tabloids which had been fitted with additional fuel tanks to attempt another raid. (Contemporary despatches and accounts state that Flight Lieutenant Sydney Vincent Sippe also took part in the raid, but was forced down before reaching German territory by a mechanical failure.) Grey arrived over Cologne to find it obscured by mist, and was again unable to find his target, so dropped his two bombs on the railway station. Marix had more luck, finding his target at Düsseldorf and dived from 3,000 to 500 feet before releasing his bombs, in the face of heavy rifle and machine fire from the ground. As he pulled away a fireball 500 feet high erupted from the shed, which contained the fully inflated airship LZ 25. Marix's aircraft sustained some damage from anti-aircraft fire, but he managed to fly to within 20 miles of Antwerp before having to land, and travelled by train and a borrowed bicycle to the aerodrome, which he found deserted apart from Grey, Sippe, and a party of Royal Marines. They promptly left the city by truck. Antwerp fell to the Germans the following day. Marix subsequently received a mention in despatches, and on 21 October, Grey, Marix and Collett were awarded the Distinguished Service Order. On 31 October Marix was promoted to flight commander.

In late 1914 Marix was flying reconnaissance near Ypres, but a mechanical fault forced him to land. He walked to the British lines and returned to his aircraft with a party of four Marines, only to find five German Uhlans inspecting his aircraft. The Marines opened fire, and four Germans promptly mounted their horses and fled. The fifth Uhlan's horse was wounded, so he ran off, pursued by Marix, who eventually took him prisoner at gunpoint. The two men returned to the aircraft where Marix courteously lent his captive a revolver to administer the coup de grâce to his suffering mount, before taking him back to the British lines.

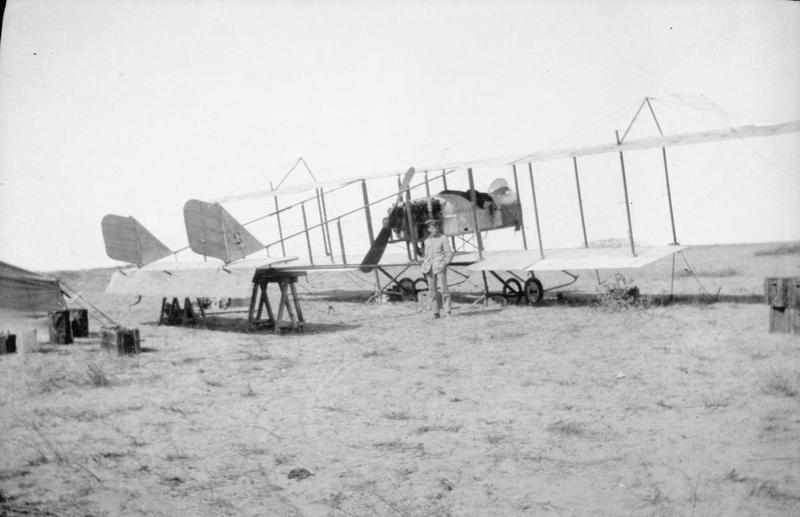
Flight Commander Marix and his Farman MF.11 aircraft at Tenedos, Gallipoli, 1915.

Marix served in the Gallipoli Campaign during through most of 1915, flying reconnaissance and bombing missions. On 17 May Marix spotted unusual activity at the small port of Ak Bashi Liman. With Samson as his observer he returned that afternoon, flying a Breguet aircraft armed with one 100-pound (45 kg) and fourteen 20-pound (9 kg) bombs. Marix attacked the port, stopping work there for two days. A further reconnaissance flight led the British to conclude that the Turks were preparing an attack on Anzac Cove, and as a result their assault of 19 May was effectively repulsed with great loss of life. Marix later received a mention in despatches from the Vice-Admiral Commanding the Eastern Mediterranean Squadron.

Marix was promoted to squadron commander on 1 January 1916, and in February formed a new squadron of Sopwith 1½ Strutters based at RNAS Detling, with the intention of mounting bombing raids on factories in the Essen and Düsseldorf areas, though it proved that the aircraft lacked the range to make these attacks successfully. However, in May 1916, a new Anglo-French strategic bombing force was created, under the command of Wing Captain William Leslie Elder, of which Marix's squadron formed the nucleus. Designated No. 3 Wing RNAS, the British aircraft were based at Luxeuil-les-Bains, close to France's eastern frontier, and comprised Sopwith 1½ Strutters and Breguet Bre.5 bombers. The first raid was mounted on 30 July when a mixed force of nine French and British aircraft attacked Mülheim. In September Marix and another pilot stopped at Paris while ferrying two Strutters to Luxeuil. They were invited to test fly a Nieuport, but Marix's aircraft broke up in mid-air, and he was seriously injured, having his left leg amputated, thus bringing his combat flying career to an abrupt end. Marix recovered from his accident, returning to serve as a staff officer. In August 1917 he was made a Chevalier of the Order of the Crown by the King of the Belgians. On 1 April 1918, the Royal Naval Air Service was merged with the Army's Royal Flying Corps to form the Royal Air Force, and Marix transferred into the new service.

== Inter-war career ==
Marix remained with the RAF post-war and on 1 August 1919 was awarded a permanent commission with the rank of major (later squadron leader). On 12 November he was appointed a temporary Staff Officer (2nd class) at the Air Ministry, and went on to serve as a member of the Inter-Allied Aeronautical Committee of Control (Germany) from 16 June 1920, and then as Officer Commanding, Motor Transport Repair Depot from 25 October 1921, until 11 April 1922. On 11 July 1922 he was awarded the Croix de Guerre avec palme by the King of the Belgians for his "valuable services rendered in connection with the war". From 25 September 1922 Marix served at the RAF Electrical and Wireless School, then on 15 January 1924 was posted to the Air Ministry, to serve on the Staff of the Directorate of Operations and Intelligence until 13 October 1924. He was placed on half-pay from 25 February to 16 September 1925, and on 24 September he was posted to the Air Staff of RAF Mediterranean. On 8 October 1928, he was transferred to the Department of the Chief of the Air Staff in the Directorate of Organisation and Staff Duties, serving there until 11 July 1932, and also receiving promotion to wing commander on 1 July 1930.

On 12 September 1932 Marix was posted to Malta where he served as Officer Commanding of the RAF Base at Kalafrana, home of No. 202 (Flying Boat) Squadron, until taking command of RAF Hal Far on 16 April 1934. In June 1934 he was awarded an Interpretership (2nd class) in French from the RAF Staff College. Marix was promoted to group captain on 1 January 1936, and on 27 April returned to command at Kalafrana, remaining there until 9 November.

Marix then returned to England, where on 1 February 1937 he was appointed Senior Air Staff Officer, in the Headquarters of No. 16 (Reconnaissance) Group, based at Lee-on-Solent. He was appointed Officer Commanding No. 16 Group on 14 March 1939 and, following the granting of the acting rank (unpaid) of air commodore on 23 August, Air Officer Commanding.

== Second World War ==
On 3 September 1939, the day Britain declared war on Germany, Marix was granted the acting rank of air vice marshal. He was promoted to the temporary rank of air commodore (acting air vice-marshal) on 1 January 1940, and a week later was appointed Deputy Senior Air Staff Officer of Coastal Command. On 11 July 1940 he was made a Companion of the Order of the Bath "in recognition of distinguished services rendered in recent operations". On 24 March 1941 he became Air Officer Commanding, No. 18 (Reconnaissance) Group. On 10 February 1942 Marix relinquished his acting rank of air vice marshal, and on 10 March became Air Officer-in-charge of Administration of Ferry Command, which took over the ferrying of new aircraft from factories in North America to the UK from the civilian Atlantic Ferry Organisation. On 11 June 1942 Marix received his third mention in despatches, and on 1 October 1942 his temporary rank of air commodore was made substantive.

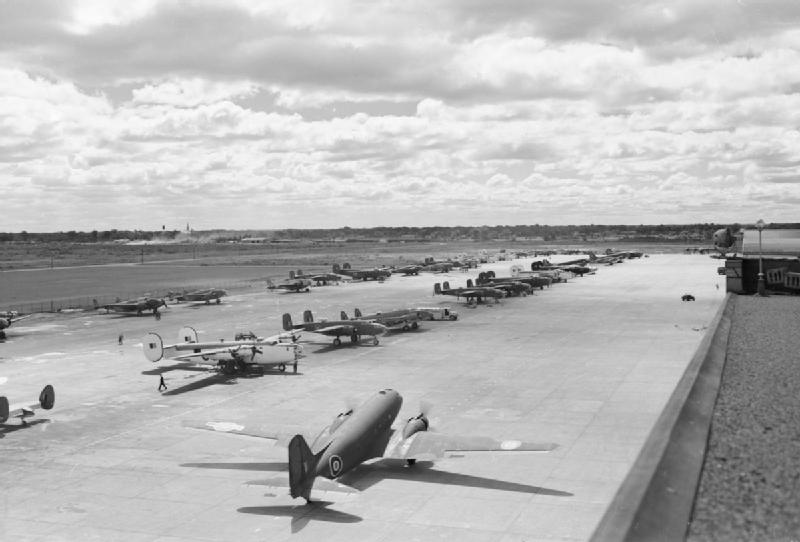
Aircraft at Dorval Airport awaiting delivery to the UK via the North Atlantic route.

On 25 March 1943 Ferry Command was redesignated No. 45 (Atlantic Ferry) Group within the newly created Transport Command. On 1 April Marix was appointed Air Officer Commanding, No. 45 Group, and granted the acting rank of air vice-marshal for the second time on 11 April, which was made temporary on 1 June. On 12 June he was awarded the Order of Polonia Restituta (2nd class) by the President of the Republic of Poland. As AOC, No. 45 Group, Marix was based at Dorval Airport, Montréal, Canada. The Group comprised two ferrying wings, No. 112 (North Atlantic) Wing and No. 113 (South Atlantic) Wing, a Training Wing and a Communications Squadron, in all employing over 5,000 service and civilian personnel. On 4 January 1945 Marix arrived in Australia on an inspection tour of a new trans-Pacific ferry route from Canada to Australia, run by No. 45 Group in collaboration with the American Air Transport Command, in anticipation of increased activity in the South West Pacific theatre. He commanded No. 45 Group until replaced by Air Vice Marshal George Beamish on 15 June 1945. Marix then served at the Headquarters of Transport Command, until retiring from the RAF on medical grounds on 6 December 1945, retaining the rank of air vice marshal.

Air Vice Marshal Marix died on 7 January 1966. In May 2016 his medals, logbook and service revolver were donated to the RAF Museum by his 91-year-old daughter-in-law Yvelene de Marcellus Marix in Washington D.C.

Military offices
Preceded by Christopher Courtney	Air Officer Commanding No. 16 Group; 1939–1940	Succeeded by John Tyssen
Preceded by Charles Breese	Air Officer Commanding No. 18 Group; 1941–1942	Succeeded by Albert Durston
New command	Air Officer Commanding No. 45 Group; 1943–1945	Succeeded by George Beamish
