= Spenser Grey =

Spenser Douglas Adair Grey
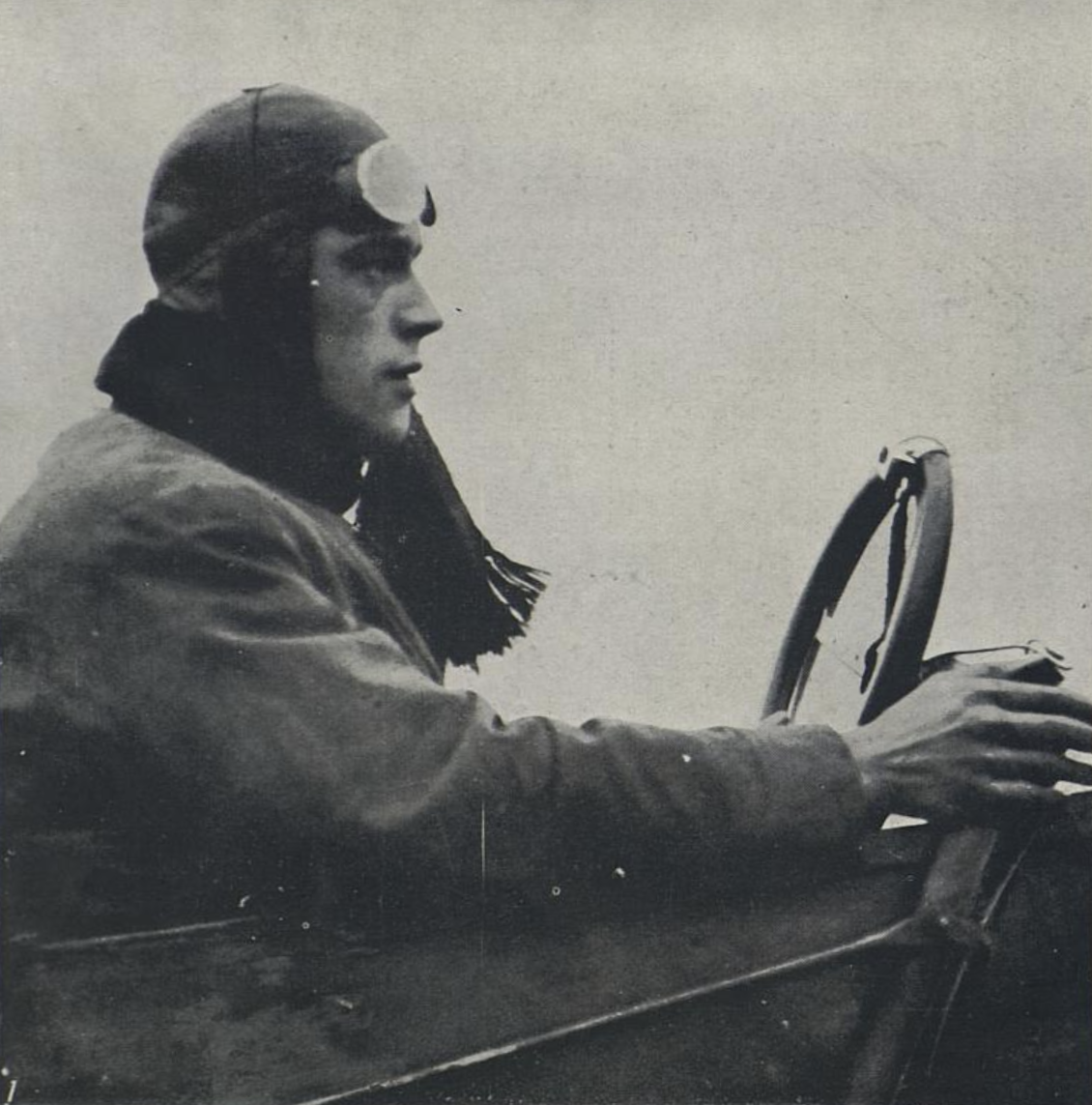
- Spenser D. A. Grey (The Illustrated War News, 1914)
- Born: 10 February 1889; Rio de Janeiro, Brazil
- Died: 8 October 1937 (aged 48); London, England
- Military career
- Allegiance: United Kingdom
- Branch: Royal Navy; Royal Air Force
- Service years: c. 1910–1919
- Rank: Lieutenant-colonel
- Conflicts: World War I; Western Front
- Awards: Distinguished Service Order

Lieutenant-Colonel Spenser Douglas Adair Grey DSO (10 February 1889 – 8 October 1937) was a British flying officer of the Royal Naval Air Service and Royal Air Force during World War I, who took part in the first British strategic bombing raids in October 1914.

== Family background ==
Grey was born in Rio de Janeiro the only son of Douglas Charles Campbell Grey (1861–1912) and Alice Mary Fawconer (née Galpin). Grey was a direct descendant of General Charles Grey, 1st Earl Grey, by his youngest son Edward Grey, and his second wife Elizabeth Adair.

== Early military career ==
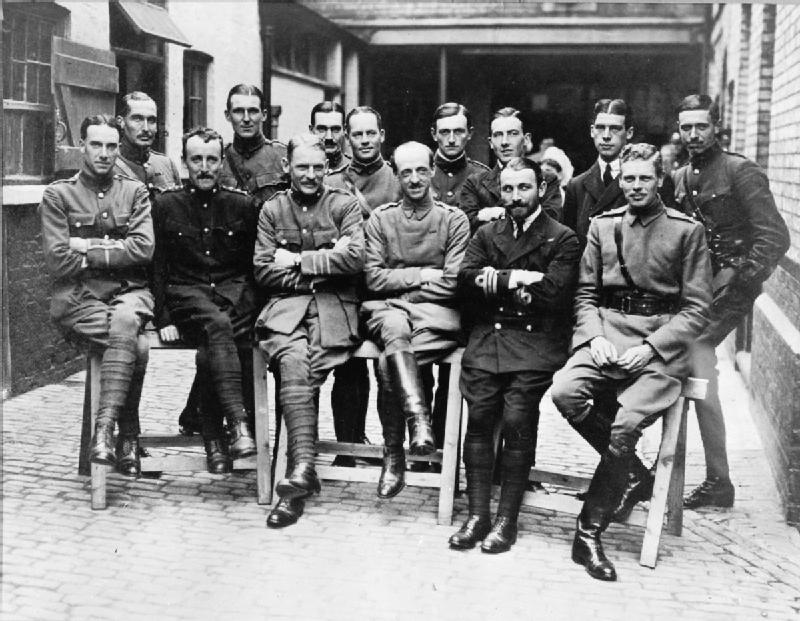
Lieutenant Grey (3rd from right) with other officers of the Royal Flying Corps in 1913

Grey was serving as a sub-lieutenant in the Royal Navy when he first became interested in flying. He attended the Hewlett & Blondeau School at Brooklands, showing "remarkable aptitude", and qualified as a pilot after only seven lessons, being awarded Royal Aero Club Aviators' Certificate No. 117 on 17 August 1911. On 1 October 1911 Grey was promoted to lieutenant. He was transferred the Naval Wing of the Royal Flying Corps, and on 27 December 1912 was appointed a flight commander.

On 29 March 1913 Grey was appointed commander of the newly created Calshot Naval Air Station. Winston Churchill, then the First Lord of the Admiralty, visited Calshot twice in September 1913. On the first occasion, Grey took Churchill and Colonel John Seely, the Secretary of State for War, on flights out over the Solent and Southampton Water. About a week later Churchill returned, along with his wife Clementine, and Grey again took them both up in short flights from Brown's Field, Hamble in a Sopwith Tractor. On 15 January 1914 Grey was appointed a squadron commander.

== World War I ==
On 1 July 1914 the Naval Wing of the RFC was redesignated the Royal Naval Air Service, and soon after, on 4 August, Britain declared war on Germany. Three RNAS squadrons were swiftly deployed to Belgium and France, primarily to fly reconnaissance missions. Grey was in command of the RNAS squadron at Calais, when in early September an RNAS unit, comprising six aircraft taken from each squadron, were sent to Wilrijk aerodrome in Antwerp. Under the orders of Churchill, it was tasked with mounting the first long-distance bombing raid on Germany. Their targets were the airship sheds at Düsseldorf and Cologne, in order to forestall Zeppelin raids on England. For the first mission on 22 September, Baron Pierre de Caters provided a force of Belgian armoured cars which was sent out to create and defend a forward landing strip west of the Meuse, as the British aircraft did not have sufficient range to fly directly to their targets and back. The first raid was commanded by Squadron Commander Eugene Gerrard, who with Flight Lieutenant Reginald Marix, headed for Cologne, while Grey and Lieutenant Charles Collet flew to Düsseldorf. Their Sopwith aircraft had no fixed machine-guns, the pilots being armed only with revolvers, and carried only two or four 20-pound (9 kg) Hales bombs. By the time the four aircraft crossed the River Roer, fog obscured the ground and Collet was the only pilot to find his target, the airship shed at Düsseldorf. He dropped his bombs from a low level, but only one hit the shed, and it failed to explode.

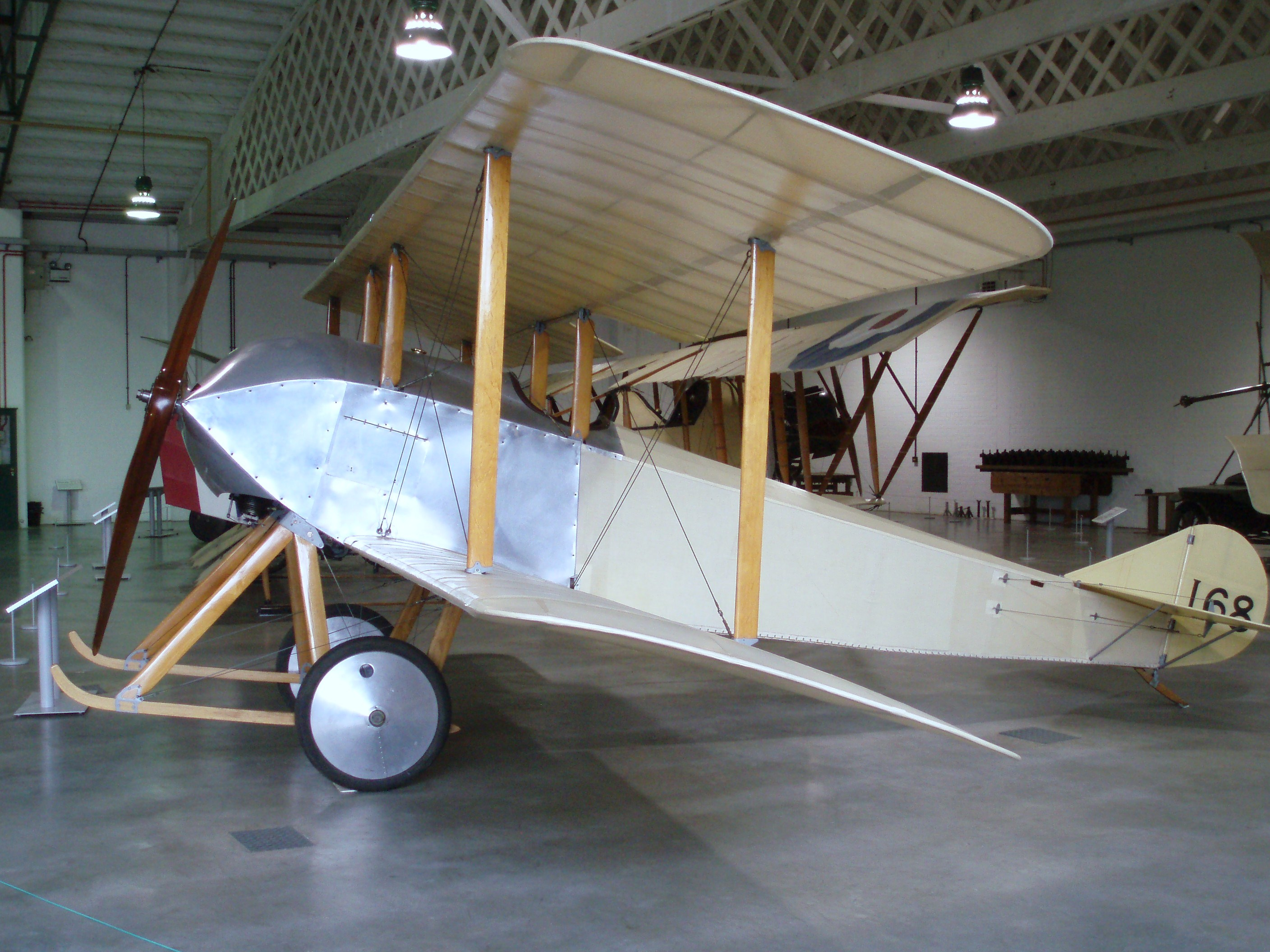
Replica of the Sopwith Tabloid (No. 168) in which Lt. Marix bombed the airship hangar at Düsseldorf, RAF Museum Hendon.

On 28 September Antwerp came under attack by German heavy guns, and the RNAS aircraft assisted the Belgian defenders by flying artillery spotting missions. However, by early October, with the fall of the city seemingly inevitable, most of the RNAS unit was evacuated. On 8 October Grey and Marix took off in two Sopwith Tabloids which had been fitted with additional fuel tanks to attempt another raid. (Contemporary despatches and accounts state that Flight Lieutenant Sydney Vincent Sippe also took part in the raid, but was forced down before reaching German territory by a mechanical failure.) Grey arrived over Cologne to find it obscured by mist, and was again unable to find his target, so dropped his two bombs on the railway station. Marix had more luck, finding his target at Düsseldorf and dived from 3,000 to 500 feet before releasing his bombs, in the face of heavy rifle and machine fire from the ground. As he pulled away a fireball 500 feet high erupted from the shed, which contained the fully inflated airship LZ 25. Marix's aircraft sustained some damage from anti-aircraft fire, but he managed to fly to within 20 miles of Antwerp before having to land, eventually returning to the aerodrome, which he found deserted apart from Grey, Sippe, and a party of Royal Marines. They promptly left the city by truck. Antwerp fell to the Germans the following day. On 21 October, Grey, Marix and Collett were awarded the Distinguished Service Order.

Grey continued to serve, and was promoted to wing commander on 31 December 1916. He was eventually retired from flying duty after sustaining injuries in several crashes, and ended the war serving in Paris as a liaison officer to the American air service. The Royal Naval Air Service had merged with the Army's Royal Flying Corps to form the Royal Air Force on 1 April 1918, so when Grey relinquished his commission on account of ill-health on 25 January 1919, he retained the rank of lieutenant-colonel, RAF.

== Post-war career ==
In 1922 Grey took part in the first King's Cup Race, flying Blackburn Kangaroo, G-EAMJ, entered by Winston Churchill. However, he and Reginald W. Kenworthy, also flying a Kangaroo, both retired at Newcastle as they could not reach Glasgow before dark.

Grey died on 8 October 1937 as a result of falling from the roof of his flat in London while rigging up an aerial for his wireless.
