= Arthur Byng =

English cricketer and army officer

Personal information
- Full name: Arthur Maitland Byng
- Born: 26 October 1872; Southsea, Hampshire, England
- Died: 14 September 1914 (aged 41); Vailly, Aube, France
- Batting: Right-handed
- Bowling: Unknown
- Relatives: John Byng (brother); Frederick Stephens (uncle); William Fuller-Maitland (grandfather); Berkeley Stephens (cousin)

Domestic team information
- Years: Team
- 1896/97: Jamaica
- 1905: Hampshire

Career statistics
Competition	First-class
Matches	8
Runs scored	252
Batting average	16.80
100s/50s	–/1
Top score	70
Balls bowled	286
Wickets	7
Bowling average	24.00
5 wickets in innings	–
10 wickets in match	–
Best bowling	3/53
Catches/stumpings	8/–
- Source: Cricinfo, 10 December 2009

Arthur Maitland Byng (26 October 1872 – 14 September 1914) was an English first-class cricketer and British Army officer.

The son of the soldier A. H. Byng, he was born at Southsea in October 1872. He was educated at The Grange School on the Isle of Wight. Byng graduated from the Royal Military College as a second lieutenant into the West India Regiment in September 1895, with promotion to lieutenant following in October 1897. Whilst stationed in British Jamaica, Byng made his debut in first-class cricket for Jamaica against British Guiana at Georgetown in September 1896. He made two further first-class appearances for Jamaica in September, making a second appearance against British Guiana, before following this up with an appearance against Barbados. In March 1897, he made his final two first-class appearances for Jamaica against a touring Arthur Priestley's personal eleven. Byng was promoted to captain in July 1900. He continued to serve with the West Indian Regiment until March 1901, when he transferred to the 4th Battalion Royal Fusiliers. Byng served with the 4th Battalion during the Second Boer War, seeing action in the Transvaal, Orange Free State, and Cape Colony.

Following the end of the war in May 1902, he left Cape Town on the SS Scot in early September, and returned to the United Kingdom. For his service, he received the King's medal (with four clasps). On his return he was back as a regular officer in his regiment. Byng was soon after seconded to the Egyptian Army, an assignment which lasted until 1905. Returning to England later in 1905, he played three first-class cricket matches for Hampshire that year against Kent, Warwickshire, and Northamptonshire. In eight first-class matches, Byng scored 252 runs at an average of 16.80; he made one half century, a score of 70 in his second match against British Guiana. Outside the first-class game, Byng was a prolific batsman in services and club cricket. In 1905, he scored 204 runs in a partnership of 335 for the first wicket alongside David Steele for the Hampshire Hogs against the Royal Navy. He also scored heavily for the Royal Fusiliers. In December 1908, he became an adjutant in the Special Reserve until 1912.

Byng served in the First World War, departing for the Western Front in August 1914. He saw action during the First Battle of the Aisne in September 1914, during the course of which he was killed in action on the 14th, while conducting reconnaissance on German positions using his field glasses; Byng was shot in the throat and killed instantly. He has no known grave, but is commemorated on the La Ferté-sous-Jouarre memorial. A number of relatives were also first-class cricket, including: his brother John, uncle Frederick Stephens, cousin Berkeley Stephens, and grandfather William Fuller-Maitland. He was also related to the Viscount Torrington.
