= Jervoise =

Jervoise is a surname and given name. Notable people with these names include:

== Surname ==
- George Purefoy-Jervoise (1770–1847), English landowner, MP for Salisbury and for Hampshire
- Jervoise Clarke Jervoise (Yarmouth MP) (c.1743–1808), English Whig Member of Parliament (MP) for Yarmouth and Hampshire between 1768 and 1808
- Sir Jervoise Clarke-Jervoise, 2nd Baronet (1804–1889), MP for Hampshire 1857–1868
- Richard Jervoise (1615 – before 1645), MP for Whitchurch 1640–1645
- Thomas Jervoise, several people

== Given name ==
- Jervoise Athelstane Baines (1847–1925), British officer in the Indian civil service
- Jervoise Smith (1828–1884), British banker, MP for Penryn and Falmouth 1866–1868

== See also ==
- Clarke-Jervoise baronets
