= George Hogben =

New Zealand educationalist, seismologist (1853–1920)

George Hogben CMG (14 July 1853 – 26 April 1920) was an educationalist and seismologist of New Zealand . He was born in Islington, Middlesex, England on 14 July 1853, and died after a short illness at home in Khandallah, Wellington . He was Inspector-General of Schools in New Zealand and was appointed CMG in the 1915 New Year Honours.
