= Berkeley Stephens =

English cricketer (1871–1950)

Personal information
- Full name: Berkeley John Byng Stephens
- Born: 22 July 1871; Huntingdon, Huntingdonshire, England
- Died: 5 May 1950 (aged 78); Barnwood, Gloucestershire, England
- Batting: Right-handed
- Role: Wicket-keeper
- Relatives: Frederick Stephens (father); Arthur Byng (cousin)

Domestic team information
- Years: Team
- 1895/96–1899/00: Europeans

Career statistics
Competition	First-class
Matches	4
Runs scored	4
Batting average	0.66
100s/50s	–/–
Top score	2
Catches/stumpings	5/3
- Source: ESPNcricinfo, 26 November 2022

Berkeley John Byng Stephens CIE (22 July 1871 — 5 May 1950) was an English first-class cricketer and merchant.

The son of the cricketer and British Army officer Frederick Stephens, he was born at Huntingdon in July 1871. He was educated at Winchester College, where he played for the college cricket team. After completing his education, he worked as a merchant in Liverpool for Messrs W. & R. Graham & Co.. Going to British India, he worked in the teak trade for the Bombay and Burmah Trading Corporation, holding the position of manager of the companies Rangoon operations from 1905 to 1915. While in India, Stephens played first-class cricket for the Europeans cricket team on four occasions as a wicket-keeper in the Bombay Presidency Match between 1895 and 1899. He took five catches and made three stumpings in these matches. He was a made a Companion of the Order of the Indian Empire in the 1915 New Year Honours, for his service as a Member of the Council of Harcourt Butler, the Lieutenant-Governor of Burma. Returning to England in his later life, he was a director of the Cirencester Brewery. Formerly a churchwarden at Cirencester, Stephens died there at a nursing home in May 1950, having spent the final years of his life in considerable ill-health.
