= Jervis =

Jervis may refer to:

== Places ==
- Cape Jervis, South Australia
- Jervis Shopping Centre, Dublin
- Jervis Bay, New South Wales, Australia, an ocean bay and a village
- Jervis Inlet, British Columbia, Canada
- Jervis Island, now known as Rábida Island, one of the Galápagos Islands
- Jervis Street, a street in Dublin, Ireland
  - Jervis Luas stop, a stop on the Dublin Luas red line

== Other uses ==
- Jervis (name), a list of people with the given name or surname
- Baron Jervis, a title held by Royal Navy Admiral John Jervis (1735–1823)
- HMS Jervis, a Royal Navy destroyer

== See also ==
- Port Jervis, New York, United States, a city
- Jarvis (disambiguation)
- Gervis (disambiguation)
