= Gervis =

Gervis may refer to:

- Gervis, Iran, a village in West Azerbaijan Province

== People with the surname ==
- Bert Gervis, birth name of Burt Ward (born 1945), American television actor and activist
- Ruth Gervis (1894–1988), British illustrator

== See also ==
- Tapps-Gervis-Meyrick baronets
- Jervis (disambiguation)
- Gervais (disambiguation)
