= Charles Breese (RAF officer) =

Royal Air Force Air Vice-Marshal (1889–1941)

Charles Dempster Breese
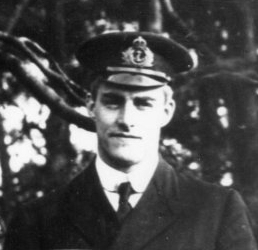
- Breese in Royal Navy uniform
- Born: 23 April 1889
- Died: 5 March 1941 (aged 51)
- Military career
- Allegiance: United Kingdom
- Branch: Royal Navy (1909–18); Royal Air Force (1918–41)
- Service years: 1909–41
- Rank: Air Vice Marshal
- Commands: No. 18 Group (1938–41); No. 17 Group (1937–38); No. 23 Group (1936–37); RAF Gosport (1928–30); Central Flying School (1919–20); No. 6 Squadron RNAS (1917); No. 10 Squadron RNAS (1917)
- Conflicts: World War I World War II
- Awards: Companion of the Order of the Bath; Air Force Cross; Mentioned in Despatches (2)

Air Vice Marshal Charles Dempster Breese, CB, AFC (23 April 1889 – 5 March 1941) was an officer in the Royal Navy and a senior officer in the Royal Air Force in the first half of the 20th century.

== Honours ==
- 1933 – Companion of the Order of the Bath for valuable services rendered in connection with the operations in Northern Kurdistan, Iraq during the period December 1931 to June 1932.

Military offices
New title Group established	Air Officer Commanding No. 18 Group; 1938–1941	Succeeded by Reginald Marix
Preceded by Patrick Playfair	Commandant of the Central Flying School; 1919–1920	Succeeded by Norman MacEwen
