= Thomas Jervoise =

Thomas Jervoise may refer to:

- Thomas Jervoise (died 1654), English politician, MP for Whitchurch
- Thomas Jervoise (died 1693), English politician, MP for Hampshire (son of the above)
- Thomas Jervoise (died 1743), English politician, MP for Stockbridge, Hampshire, Plympton Erle and Hindon (son of the above)
- Thomas Clarke Jervoise (1764–1809), English politician, MP for Yarmouth
