= Sydney Sippe =

British pioneer aviator

- Sippe in 1913
- Born: Sydney Vincent Sippe; 24 April 1889; Brixton, London
- Died: 17 November 1968 (aged 79); Leatherhead, Surrey
- Spouse: Mabel D'Arcy (m. 1915; div. 1933)
- Awards: Legion of Honour, Distinguished Service Order, Croix de Guerre, Officer of the Order of the British Empire, Chevalier of the Order of Leopold (Belgium)
- Aviation career
- Famous flights: First flight from the sea in Britain (1912); 1914 raid on the Zeppelin sheds at Friedrichshafen
- Flight license: January 1912 (Royal Aero Club certificate No. 172); Brooklands
- Air force: Royal Naval Air Service; Royal Air Force
- Battles: World War I
- Rank: Squadron Commander (RNAS); Major (RAF)

Major Sydney Vincent Sippe DSO OBE FRAeS (pronounced sip-ee) (24 April 1889 – 17 November 1968) was a British pioneer aviator. He designed, built and tested early aeroplanes, and made the first successful flight from seawater in Britain. He served in the Royal Naval Air Service during World War I, taking part in some of the earliest strategic bombing operations, and was decorated by Britain, France and Belgium. He is particularly remembered for the November 1914 bombing of the German Zeppelin works at Friedrichshafen, one of the earliest long-distance bombing missions. After the war he trained pilots in Japan, and led an attempt to recover reputed gold from the wreck of the SS Tubantia, involving a key legal case about salvage.

== Early life ==
Sippe's parents were Charles Henry Sippe (1842–1924), a shipping export agent (whose firm, C H Sippe & Sons Ltd, still existed until c.2013), and Elizabeth Jane Thornton (born 1846). They had moved to Britain from Australia, both families having originally emigrated from Liverpool.

The youngest of nine children, Sydney Sippe was born in 1889 in Brixton, London, where his parents lived at 17 Lambert Road. He was educated at Dulwich College from May 1903 to December 1905.

== Name and title ==
Sippe was named after Sydney, Australia, where both his parents had lived. His first name is often misspelled 'Sidney', even on official documents, and his surname sometimes written with an accent, 'Sippé', as if of French origin. The form 'Sydney Vincent Sippe' is used both on his birth and death certificates.

Following his service during World War I, Sippe continued to use the title major – and was known as 'the Major' – even though the RAF rank was renamed squadron leader in 1919. He also went by the nickname Pi (pronounced like 'pie'), and was known to his family as Pipi.

== Aviation pioneer ==
After leaving school, in February 1906 Sippe became an engineering apprentice with British Westinghouse in Manchester.

=== Inventor ===
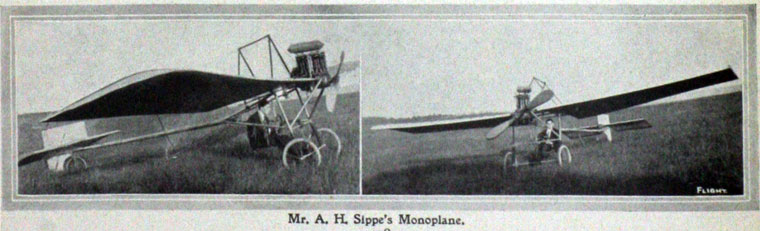
The Sippes' monoplane

Between late 1909 and early 1910, shortly after Wilbur Wright first demonstrated powered flight in Europe, Sippe (aged 20), his brother Arthur, and their friend James Jensen (or Jenson) designed and built a monoplane. It had an oxy-acetylene-welded steel-tube forward structure, a bamboo rear fuselage, a detachable one-piece wing and wheel-operated elevator and wing-warping controls; the pilot sat below the wing, giving a low centre of gravity. Lack of funds and a suitable practice ground had prevented an adequate trial. Its attempted maiden flight on 24 April 1910 at Addington, Croydon, may also have failed because the engine was insufficiently powerful:

Sydney Sippe was thrown forward with some violence and his nose came into collision with one of the steel tubes. The nose came off worst, and a piece of flesh was removed from the inside of his thigh. That, with sundry bruises, was all. A well-meaning friend rushed up with a flask of whisky, which he thrust into the pilot's mouth, and so Sydney Sippe arrived home to his mother with a broken nose, a bleeding thigh—and slightly intoxicated.

=== Test and demonstration pilot ===
He learned to fly at the Avro school at Brooklands, where he was already flying by the autumn of 1911: reporting from Brooklands that September, Flight noted that "Sidney V. Sippe was in the air, and made two or three turns in good style" on the Avro school's new biplane. By the end of that month he was flying solo circuits on the Avro biplane He gained Royal Aero Club Aviator's Certificate No. 172, taken on an Avro biplane and announced on 13 January 1912, "in a way which showed that he had thoroughly mastered the art". He immediately became a test and demonstration pilot. Three weeks after his flying test he survived a crash near Finchampstead caused by a frozen carburettor; the aircraft was wrecked, but Sippe escaped unhurt.

In the spring of 1912 he supervised and flew trials of Commander Oliver Schwann's Avro Type D hydro-aeroplane at Barrow-in-Furness. Schwann's own attempt in the same machine the previous November had ended with it capsizing on alighting. On 2 April 1912, flying from Cavendish Dock, Sippe made the first successful flight from seawater in Britain. Flight reported that the rebuilt machine had duralumin floats made at the Vickers works and that spray was damaging its propeller tips. The 35-hp British machine left the water after a run of under 100 yards (91 m) and climbed to about 200 feet (61 m) despite intermittent engine misfiring.

In May 1912 Sippe was appointed chief pilot of Hanriot (England) Ltd. While practising at Reims he completed a 50-kilometre (31 mi) flight at about 400 metres (1,300 ft) and later climbed to about 600 metres (2,000 ft). Engine failure during another test forced him to land in a cornfield; the monoplane overturned without serious damage, and he flew it again in the first Aerial Derby on 8 June 1912. The race around London was sponsored by the Daily Mail and included Thomas Sopwith (the eventual winner, after an appeal) and William Rhodes-Moorhouse. Sippe, flying the Hanriot monoplane, was the first competitor to start from Hendon and was awarded a silver shield by the Daily Mail judges, but engine trouble forced him out of the race.

In August 1912 he flew one of the two Hanriot monoplanes entered for the Military Aeroplane Competition at Larkhill on Salisbury Plain, the other being flown by the Peruvian aviator Juan Bielovucic. The Hanriots recorded the fastest speed over the measured course (75.4 mph) and the best rate of climb of the competition, which was nonetheless won by S. F. Cody's biplane; the Hanriot gained no orders.

Later that year he joined the Bristol Aeroplane Company, carried out delivery tests of Bristol monoplanes and remained in Italy while the first licence-built Caproni-Bristol machines were assembled. He took part in the 1913 Italian military aeroplane competition, in which the Bristol-Caproni entries failed to reach the final trials. On returning to Britain he undertook flight testing and instruction on Salisbury Plain. In December 1912 Flight had also published his first-person account, “Testing a 100-H.P. Monoplane: A Reminiscence”, describing an early-morning test flight at Reims.

On 30 July 1914, shortly before the outbreak of war, Sippe took the owner R. P. Creagh to 11,000 feet (3,400 m) in Creagh's 80-hp Bristol biplane at Brooklands. After about an hour aloft he descended in tight spirals and made a dead-stick landing without restarting the engine; Flight described the landing as perfect.

== War service ==
In 1914, at the outbreak of World War I, Sippe immediately joined up: he was commissioned as an Acting Flight Lieutenant and confirmed in the rank of Flight Lieutenant for temporary service, his commission dated 4 August 1914—the day Britain declared war. He served in the Royal Naval Air Service. He was posted to the RNAS force operating from Wilrijk aerodrome at Antwerp, which in September and October 1914 mounted the Entente's first strategic bombing raids, against the Zeppelin sheds at Düsseldorf and Cologne. Contemporary despatches record that on the second raid, on 8 October 1914, Sippe set out alongside Spenser Grey and Reginald Marix, but was forced down by mechanical trouble before reaching German territory; Marix destroyed the Zeppelin Z IX in its shed at Düsseldorf, while Grey, unable to find his target in mist, bombed Cologne railway station. Antwerp fell to the Germans the following day; Sippe, Grey and a party of Royal Marines were among the last to leave the abandoned aerodrome, escaping the city by road.

=== Friedrichshafen raid ===
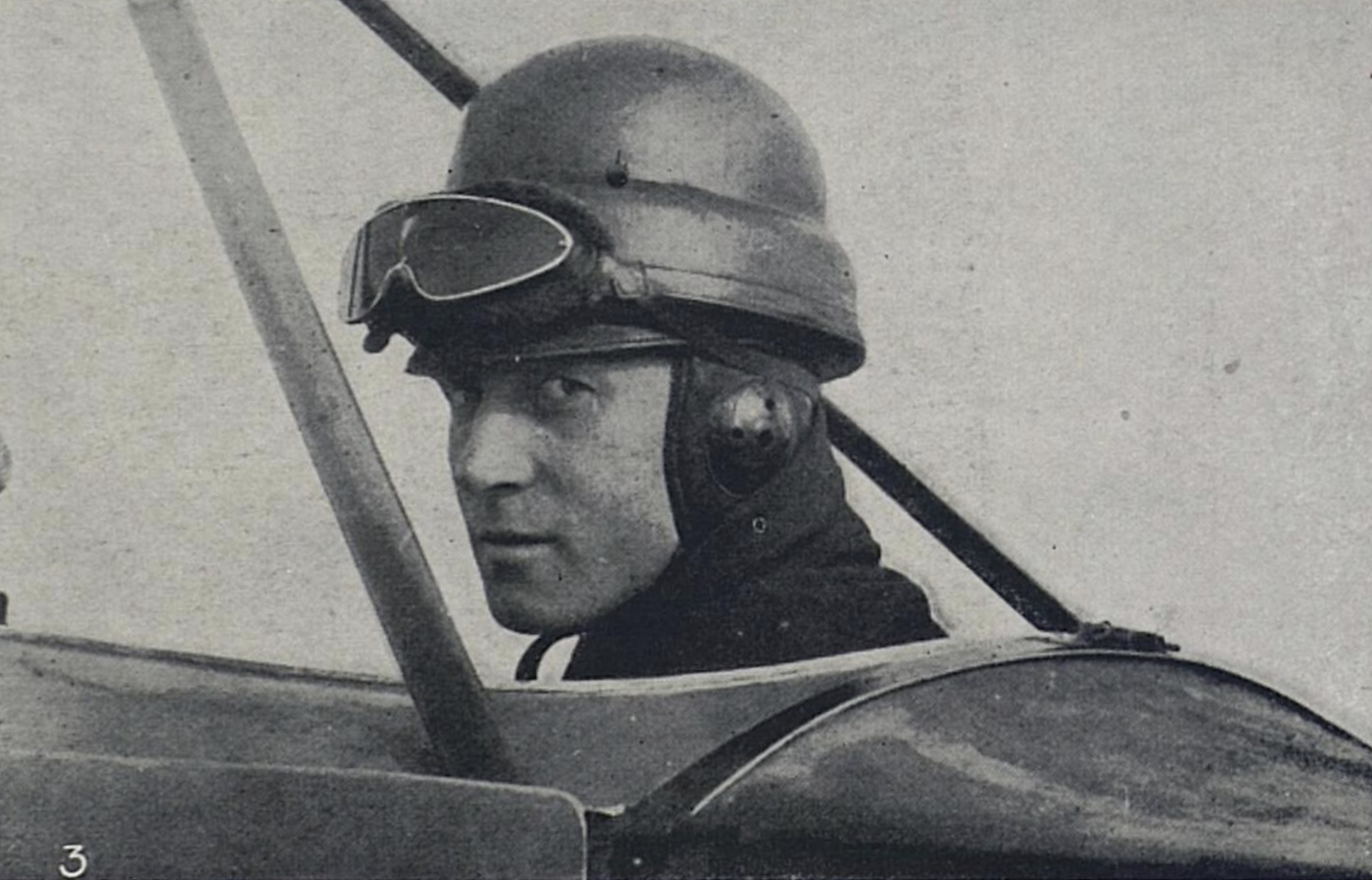
Sippe pictured in The Illustrated War News, 1914

This was followed by a celebrated attack on the Zeppelin sheds and factories at Friedrichshafen, Germany on 21 November 1914, one of the first long-distance bombing missions. For the raid a special "Avro Flight" was formed at Manchester in October 1914 under Squadron Commander P. Shepherd, equipped with four brand-new Avro 504s (Nos. 179, 873, 874 and 875) straight from the Avro works, each fitted to carry four 20-pound (9.1 kg) Hales bombs. The crated aircraft were shipped to Le Havre and taken by rail to Belfort, France, arriving on the night of 13 November, where they were kept hidden to preserve secrecy. Shepherd fell ill and command passed to Squadron Commander Edward Featherstone Briggs.

On the morning of 21 November the aircraft took off at intervals: Briggs first in No. 873, then Flight Commander John Tremayne Babington in No. 875, and Sippe in No. 874; the fourth machine, No. 179 flown by Flight Sub-Lieutenant R. P. Cannon, broke its tail-skid and could not take off. (Note: Accounts of the departure differ. The contemporary account published in Flight (4 December 1914, p. 1180, drawing on Le Figaro's interview-based report after Sippe and Babington passed through Paris) gives a start at 10:10 a.m. at five-minute intervals in the order Briggs–Sippe–Babington. Modern reconstructions from the official records give an earlier start and the order Briggs–Babington–Sippe.)

The three pilots flew 125 miles (201 km) from Belfort over mountainous terrain and in difficult weather—a risky flight near the limit of the aircraft's range. The distance was increased by the need to avoid flying over neutral Switzerland: Churchill told the House of Commons that the pilots had been given instructions to avoid neutral territory, and that the course drawn on their maps should have taken them well clear of it. Reaching Lake Constance, Sippe descended in mist to about ten feet above the water so as to reduce the likelihood of being seen; his report of the flight, written up in timed entries and published in the Admiralty despatch of 17 December 1914, records that at 11:30 he "came down to within 10 feet of water" and hugged the north shore of the lake until about five miles from the objective, before climbing to 1,200 feet for the attack. Making two passes over the works under heavy fire, he dropped one bomb to distract the gun crews and aimed his remaining bombs at the sheds. Despite their aircraft taking damage, the three pilots bombed their targets, dropping eleven bombs in all. Although substantial damage was claimed at the time and in some later histories, the damage inflicted was slight.

Briggs was shot down, wounded and captured (he later escaped from Germany), but Sippe and Babington returned safely: Sippe landed back at Belfort, at the exact point from which he had started, after a flight of 3 hours 50 minutes.

The raid was announced by Winston Churchill, then First Lord of the Admiralty, who called it "a fine feat of arms". One historian concluded: "The pilots deserve all praise for their admirable navigation... this flight of 250 miles, into gunfire, across enemy country, in the frail little Avro with its humble horse-power, can compare as an achievement with the best of them".

The bullet-damaged tail of Sippe's (or possibly one of the other pilots') plane was later mounted on a plaque as a souvenir.

=== Honours ===
All three pilots—including Briggs, then a prisoner of war—were decorated with the French Legion of Honour (rarely given to foreigners) immediately after the Friedrichshafen raid, at the request of General Joffre himself; the crosses were pinned on Sippe and Babington by the Governor of Belfort at a review on the morning of 23 November, and the Royal Aero Club recorded the decoration of all three members. All three pilots were awarded the Distinguished Service Order in the 1915 New Year Honours. Sippe was awarded the OBE in the 1919 New Year's Honours. He was also awarded the Croix de Guerre, and made a Chevalier of the Belgian Order of Leopold.

Sippe was mentioned in dispatches six times during the war. On the amalgamation of the RNAS and the Royal Flying Corps into the Royal Air Force on 1 April 1918, his RNAS rank of squadron commander translated to the RAF rank of major, the title by which he was known for the rest of his life.

== Post-war ==
In July 1920, Sippe was one of the pioneers invited to the "First Hundred" dinner at the Connaught Rooms, held in honour of Britain's earliest certificated pilots and attended by the Duke of York. While his certificate (no. 172) placed him outside the first hundred, he was among the further guests "whose pioneering activities were not confined to piloting".

In the early 1920s, Sippe went to Japan to train pilots, possibly as part of the Sempill Mission.

=== The Tubantia salvage ===
In 1922, Sippe began a secret attempt to salvage what was thought to be £2 million worth of gold coins (£100 million in 2012 prices) from the SS Tubantia, a Dutch liner which had been torpedoed off the Dutch coast in 1916—the largest neutral ship sunk in the First World War. The gold was rumoured to have been concealed in the ship's cargo, according to one persistent story inside cheeses.

When a rival salvage operation, using the steamship Semper Paratus, arrived over the wreck in July 1923 and interfered with his divers, Sippe's syndicate sued. In a landmark judgment delivered in February 1924, The Tubantia [1924] P 78, the High Court held that, as his divers had found the ship and begun work upon her, the syndicate was in possession of the wreck and entitled to an injunction restraining the newcomers; the case remains the leading authority in English law on when a salvor takes possession of a sunken wreck. Flight offered its congratulations, "and good luck in future attempts at recovering the 'hidden treasure'". In 1925, after £100,000 (£5.2 million in 2012 prices) had been spent on the salvage attempt, he concluded that though the cargo had been in the ship, the difficulty of accessing it made it too dangerous for divers to recover, and so the project was abandoned.

The salvage story was the subject of a 1978 French book Le Trésor du Tubantia, also published in Dutch. In 1979 Antenne 2 produced a 64-minute French television documentary of the same title. In 2025, French broadcaster Franck Ferrand also recounted the story on Radio Classique and as a YouTube podcast.

=== Industry ===
Sippe was a sales manager with aeroplane manufacturer Short Brothers c.1920-29. In 1929 he joined Crossley Motors as sales manager of its commercial-vehicle department; a contemporary trade notice identified him as a pre-war aviator with a distinguished RNAS and RAF record. He later worked for the Fairey Aviation Company from 1946 to 1955.

== Later life ==
He later founded his own business, Field and Forest Supplies, selling products of his own invention. In 1963 he became a consultant to the 20th Century Joinery and Packing Co Ltd, a company which specialized in packing aircraft parts for transport.

He died of cancer in 1968 in Leatherhead Hospital. Despite Sippe's distinguished war record, it seems no obituary appeared in any major newspapers, as they were not aware of his death at the time.

== Family ==
On 9 December 1915, Sippe married Mabel Frances D'Arcy, only child of Gerald d'Arcy of Dublin, at the Roman Catholic Church of the Assumption, Warwick Street, London; the bride was given away by Lord Athlumney. They had two children, Angela and James, and four grandchildren. They subsequently separated, and were divorced in 1933 on the grounds of her adultery with a Greek man; the divorce was reported as far afield as Singapore and Australia.

== Commemoration ==
Sippe became a popular hero after the Friedrichshafen raid, which was widely reported in the British, French and Australian press, and depictions of it featuring Sippe appeared in wartime and post-war popular publications, including an illustration in Deeds That Thrill The Empire (c. 1919) and a French photographic postcard of "Lieutenant Sippe" published by E. Le Deley of Paris.

He was featured on at least two cigarette cards: one, with his photograph and short biography, no. 26 in a series of 50 Naval Portraits, was issued by Lambert and Butler in c.1917. Another, no. 2 in a series of 50 War Incidents, was issued by Wills. Both cards recounted the Friedrichshafen raid.

Photographs of Sippe, the three pilots and their Avro 504s at Belfort on the day of the raid are held by the Imperial War Museums.

On 28 April 2014, in the centenary year of the raid, descendants of the three pilots—Briggs, Babington and Sippe—met for the first time at the Fleet Air Arm Museum, RNAS Yeovilton, to commemorate the operation.
