= Lionel Barnett Abrahams =

English civil servant in India

Sir Lionel Barnett Abrahams KCB
- Abrahams in c1916
- Born: 1869
- Died: 1919 (aged 49–50)
- Education: Balliol College, Oxford
- Occupations: civil servant and economist
- Title: Assistant Under-secretary of State for India
- Children: 1 son

Sir Lionel Barnett Abrahams, KCB (1869–1919) was a British civil servant, economist, and historian who worked in the British government's India Office.

== Early life and education ==
Born in 1869, Abrahams was the only son of Mordecai Abrahams, a noted shochet, and long-term secretary of the Initiation Society.

Abrahams was a graduate of the City of London School and Balliol College at Oxford, which he attended 1892–1898. In 1894, he won the Arnold historical essay prize.

== Career ==
Abrahams joined the India Office in 1893. Abrahams was appointed as the secretary to the Indian currency committee in 1898. He was appointed Assistant Financial Secretary in 1901, and was appointed Financial Secretary in 1902, holding that post until 1911. He was appointed to the position of Assistant Under-secretary of State for India in 1911, and held that post until 1917. He was made a Companion of the Bath, (CB) in 1908. He was raised to Knight-Commander of the Bath (KCB) in 1915.

Abrahams was the first Jew to hold a position as high as Assistant Under-secretary of State in the British Civil Service.

In the position of Assistant Under-secretary, Abrahams needed to deal with currency and financial issues.

== Reputation ==
Shirras describes Abrahams as "a permanent official who served the financial interests of India with conspicuous efficiency and a zeal particularly his own." Shirras also writes that "It was probably of Sir Lionel Abrahams that Sir James Meston was thinking when he referred to the fact that in the Secretariat of India, 'we have not got anything like the trained competent staff that a public office in London has.'"

== Writings ==
Abrahams wrote The Expulsion of the Jews from England in 1290. This was the thesis for which he won the Arnold Prize in 1894. It was reprinted in the Jewish Quarterly Review in the issues dated October 1984 and January 1895 and April 1895. He also wrote "Debts and houses of Jews of Hereford, 1290" which was published in volume one of The Jewish Historical Society of England – Transactions in 1894.

== Personal life ==
Abrahams married Lucy, daughter of Nathan Solomon Joseph, in 1896. They had one son, Arthur Charles Lionel Abrahams.
