= David Steele (cricketer, born 1869) =

English cricketer

Personal information
- Full name: David Aubrey Steele
- Born: 3 June 1869; Southampton, Hampshire, England
- Died: 25 March 1935 (aged 65); Caterham, Surrey, England
- Batting: Right-handed
- Bowling: Right-arm slow
- Role: Occasional wicket-keeper

Domestic team information
- Years: Team
- 1886–1906: Hampshire

Career statistics
Competition	First-class
Matches	164
Runs scored	3,448
Batting average	14.01
100s/50s	–/6
Top score	80
Balls bowled	8,573
Wickets	135
Bowling average	34.28
5 wickets in innings	4
10 wickets in match	–
Best bowling	5/32
Catches/stumpings	132/5
- Source: Cricinfo, 4 March 2010

David Aubrey Steele (3 June 1869 — 25 March 1935) was an English cricketer who played first-class cricket for Hampshire from 1886 to 1906, covering both their period as a second-class county and their readmittance to first-class cricket in 1894, in which they played in the County Championship from 1895. A bowling all-rounder, he took 135 wickets and scored over 3,400 runs from 164 first-class appearances.

== Cricket career ==
Steele was born in Southampton in June 1869. A professional cricketer, he began playing for Hampshire in 1886, when Hampshire held second-class status. He played extensively for Hampshire during their period as a second-class county, remaining with Hampshire when the county regained its first-class status in 1894, ready for admission to the County Championship in 1895. He did not immediately make his first-class debut in the 1895 County Championship, but had to wait nearly three months into the season until he played against Leicestershire at Leicester, with Steele featuring three times in the County Championship that season. He made sixteen appearances in the 1896 County Championship, and played against the touring Australians at Southampton. His all-round credentials came to the fore during the season, with Steele scoring 380 runs at an average of 15.20, whilst with his slow bowling he took 23 wickets at a bowling average of 30.60. He made twenty first-class appearances in 1897, scoring 390 runs at an average of 13.92, in addition to taking 28 wickets at an average of 22.14; he claimed two five wicket hauls during the season, which included his eventual career-best figures against Somerset. He was known to sometimes share wicket-keeping duties with Teddy Wynyard and Charles Robson, and did so for Wynyard against Warwickshire in 1897, when all eleven Hampshire players bowled.

In 1898, his nineteen first-class matches yielded him 407 runs at an average of 12.71, while with the ball he took 23 wickets at an average of 30.34, but did not take more than four wickets in an innings. He had a similar return with the bat during the 1899 season, scoring 472 runs at an average of from twenty matches. He made his highest first-class score during that season, with 80 runs at Bournemouth against Leicestershire. Whilst his tally of wickets totalled 22 in 1899, his bowling average increased to 44.09. As his bowling declined, it was utilised less often by Hampshire in the seasons which followed. In 1900 he took 13 wickets, including the final five wicket haul of his career against Worcestershire, whilst in 1901 he took nine wickets. Despite the downturn in his bowling, he managed in 1900 to record his highest season aggregate with the bat, scoring 499 runs at an average of 14.25. In 1901 and 1902, his batting returns were nearly identical, with 244 and 230 runs respectively. The 1903 season was to be the last in which he made over ten first-class appearances, with 15, including playing once for the Gentlemen of the South against the Players of the South during the Bournemouth Cricket Week.

As his career wound down, he found himself playing more infrequently for Hampshire. He made eight first-class appearances in 1904, including seven in the County Championship, with seven further first-class appearances following in the 1905 County Championship, before he made a final appearance in the 1906 County Championship against Kent at Tonbridge. Described by Wisden as a "free bat, with stubborn defence at times", he scored 3,448 runs at an average of 13.89 from 163 first-class matches, but never made a century. With the ball, he took 135 wickets at an average of 34.28, taking a five wicket haul on four occasions. In the field, he took 132 catches and made five stumpings when deputising as wicket-keeper. Wisden summaised that "he never quite realised expectations". He was afforded a testimonial by Hampshire in 1907. Steele died in Caterham on 25 March 1935.
