= Charles Collet =

British World War I flying ace

Charles Herbert Collet
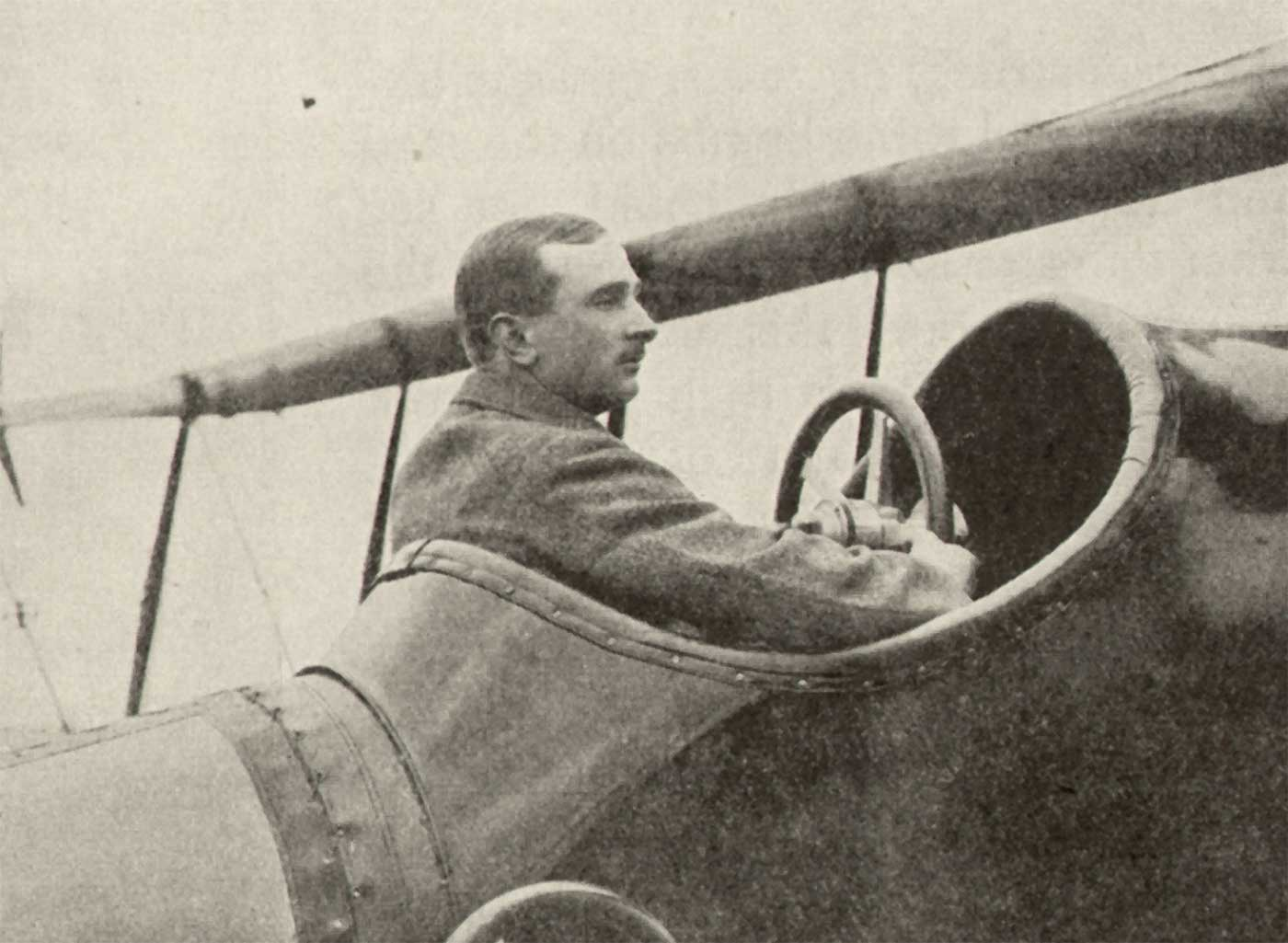
- C. H. Collet sat in his DFW Mars ca.1914
- Born: 4 February 1888; Calcutta, India
- Died: 19 August 1915 (aged 27); Imbros, Turkey
- Burial place: Lancashire Landing Cemetery, Turkey
- Military career
- Allegiance: United Kingdom
- Branch: Royal Navy
- Service years: 1905–1915
- Rank: Flight Lieutenant
- Units: Royal Marine Artillery; Royal Naval Air Service
- Conflicts: World War I • Western Front • Gallipoli Campaign
- Awards: Distinguished Service Order

Flight Lieutenant Charles Herbert Collet DSO (4 February 1888 – 19 August 1915) was a British naval airman during the First World War, regarded as one of the best naval airmen of his day.

== Early life and education ==
Charles Collet was born in India, the son of an engineer James Francis Herbert Collet and his wife Teresa Collet (née Pilley). For a time the family lived on Guernsey. At the time of his death, Charles Collet's parents lived in Woodleigh, West End, Southampton. He was educated at Dulwich College.

== Naval career ==
Collet was commissioned as a second lieutenant in the Royal Marine Artillery on 1 September 1905, and was promoted to lieutenant on 1 July 1906. On 21 October 1913 Collet was awarded Aviators' Certificate No. 666 after flying an Avro biplane at the Central Flying School at Upavon.

At the outbreak of the war on 4 August 1914, Collet was based at RNAS Eastchurch. On 10 August he took part in the Daily Mail–sponsored "Circuit of Britain" race, which was not cancelled despite the declaration of war. He flew a German-built DFW Mars (No. 154), which the RNAS had bought in 1913, and refitted with a Beardmore 120 hp engine. Unfortunately mechanical problems forced him to make an emergency landing at Scarborough racecourse, where he was promptly arrested and questioned. After repairs were made, Collet completed the race, coming second.

Collet's unit, under the command of Wing Commander Charles Rumney Samson, initially flew patrols along the North Sea coast, but on 27 August 1914 was moved to France. Renamed No. 3 Squadron RNAS, they were based at Saint-Pol-sur-Mer near Dunkirk, and operated a variety of aircraft and some improvised armoured cars.

=== The Düsseldorf Raid ===
On 22 September 1914 Collet, flying a Sopwith Tractor Biplane, led a raid by four aircraft, which flew two hundred miles to attack the Zeppelin sheds at Düsseldorf and Cologne, in the first British air raid of the war. Thick mist in the Rhine Valley meant that only Collet found his target, and he accurately dropped two 20-pound (9 kg) bombs from 400 feet (120 m) on the shed at Düsseldorf, although the bombs failed to explode. Despite being hit by enemy fire, he returned safely, as did the other three aircraft; they had spent more than an hour flying over Cologne attempting to find their target, but after failing to do so they returned to base without dropping their bombs.

Collet's feat was described thusly:

Flight Lieutenant Collet approached the Zeppelin shed at Düsseldorf at an altitude of 6,000 ft (1,800 m). There was a bank of mist below, which he encountered at 1,500 ft (460 m). He traversed the depth of this layer and emerged there from at a height of only 400 ft (120 m) above the ground. His objective was barely a quarter of a mile ahead. Travelling at high speed he launched his bombs with what proved to be deadly precision, and disappeared into cover almost before the enemy had grasped his intentions.

Collet was subsequently awarded the Distinguished Service Order on 21 October 1914.

On 23 February 1915 he was granted the temporary rank of captain whilst serving as a flight commander, and was promoted to the rank of flight lieutenant the following day. He was also twice mentioned in despatches.

In March 1915 his unit was moved from France to the island of Tenedos to take part in the Gallipoli campaign, were they flew reconnaissance and bombing missions over the Turkish positions. On 22 June Collet was flying a Voisin aircraft, with Major R.E.T. Hogg as observer, when he intercepted a German aircraft near Achi Baba. Hogg shot at it with a rifle, hitting it in the engine, and forcing it down.

== Death ==
On 19 August 1915, Collet took off from an airfield on Imbros, and had reached a height of 150–185 ft (46–56 m) when his engine failed. Collet turned to attempt a landing, but in the strong winds from the nearby cliffs he lost control, and his aircraft fell vertically to the ground, bursting into flames. His passenger, Chief Petty Officer Michael Sullivan Keogh of HMS Ark Royal, broke his thigh in the crash, but nevertheless dragged Collet from the wreckage, receiving severe burns. However, Collet was fatally injured and died 30 minutes later. Keogh was awarded the Albert Medal (2nd Class) for his attempt to save Collet's life. Collet is buried at the Lancashire Landing Cemetery in Turkey.

== Other notable achievements ==
Collet was also the first naval officer to loop the loop.
