= Billy Jervis =

English footballer (born 1942)

Personal information
- Full name: William John Jervis
- Date of birth: 22 January 1942 (age 84)
- Place of birth: Liverpool, England
- Position: Striker

Youth career
- ?–1959: Blackburn Rovers

Senior career*
| Years | Team | Apps | (Gls) |
| 1959–1961 | Blackburn Rovers | 0 | (0) |
| 1961–1962 | Gillingham | 1 | (0) |
| 1962–? | Stalybridge Celtic | | |
- * Club domestic league appearances and goals

William John Jervis (born 22 January 1942) is an English former professional footballer. He made only one appearance in The Football League, in a match which was abandoned early and represents one of the few uncompleted Football League matches for which the result was allowed to stand.

== Career ==
Born in Liverpool, Jervis began his career as a youth team player with Blackburn Rovers. He played as a striker, although he was only 5' 6" tall and slightly built. In the 1958–59 season he played in the Rovers team which defeated West Ham United in the final of the FA Youth Cup. He turned professional with Rovers in 1959, but failed to break into the club's first team. In the summer of 1961 he left the club and joined Gillingham of the Football League Fourth Division.

Jervis was selected to make his debut for Gillingham in a match away to Barrow on 9 October 1961. The Gillingham players, travelling by train to the match, missed their connection in London and were forced to charter an aeroplane to fly to Blackpool, followed by a fleet of taxis to travel the remainder of the way to Barrow-in-Furness. The players did not arrive at the Holker Street stadium until after the scheduled start time of the match. The match eventually got underway, but the light soon began to fade, a significant problem as the stadium did not have floodlights at the time. After 76 minutes the referee decided that the light was too bad to continue and abandoned the match with Barrow winning 7–0. Although the match had not been completed, the Football League's committee, rather than order the match to be replayed as is usually done in such cases, decided to allow the result to stand.

Jervis lost his place in the Gillingham team to Ronnie Waldock for the club's next match and was not selected for the first team again in the 1961–62 season. He left the club to join Stalybridge Celtic of the Cheshire County League in July 1962. The abandoned match at Barrow was thus the only Football League match in which he played. It is unknown how long he remained at Stalybridge or if he went on to play for any other clubs.
