= William Jervis (cricketer, born 1839) =

English cricketer

William Swynfen Jervis (9 November 1839 – 3 April 1920) was an English cricketer active from 1865 to 1874 who played for Lancashire. He was born in Aligarh and died in Southsea. He appeared in two first-class matches, scoring 27 runs with a highest score of 13 and took eight wickets with a best analysis of six for 30.

Jervis was an officer in British India, serving in the Royal Munster Fusiliers until he retired. He was later lieutenant-colonel in command of the 1st Volunteer battalion, the Royal Warwickshire Regiment until March 1900.
