= Amy Carlson =

American actress (born 1968)

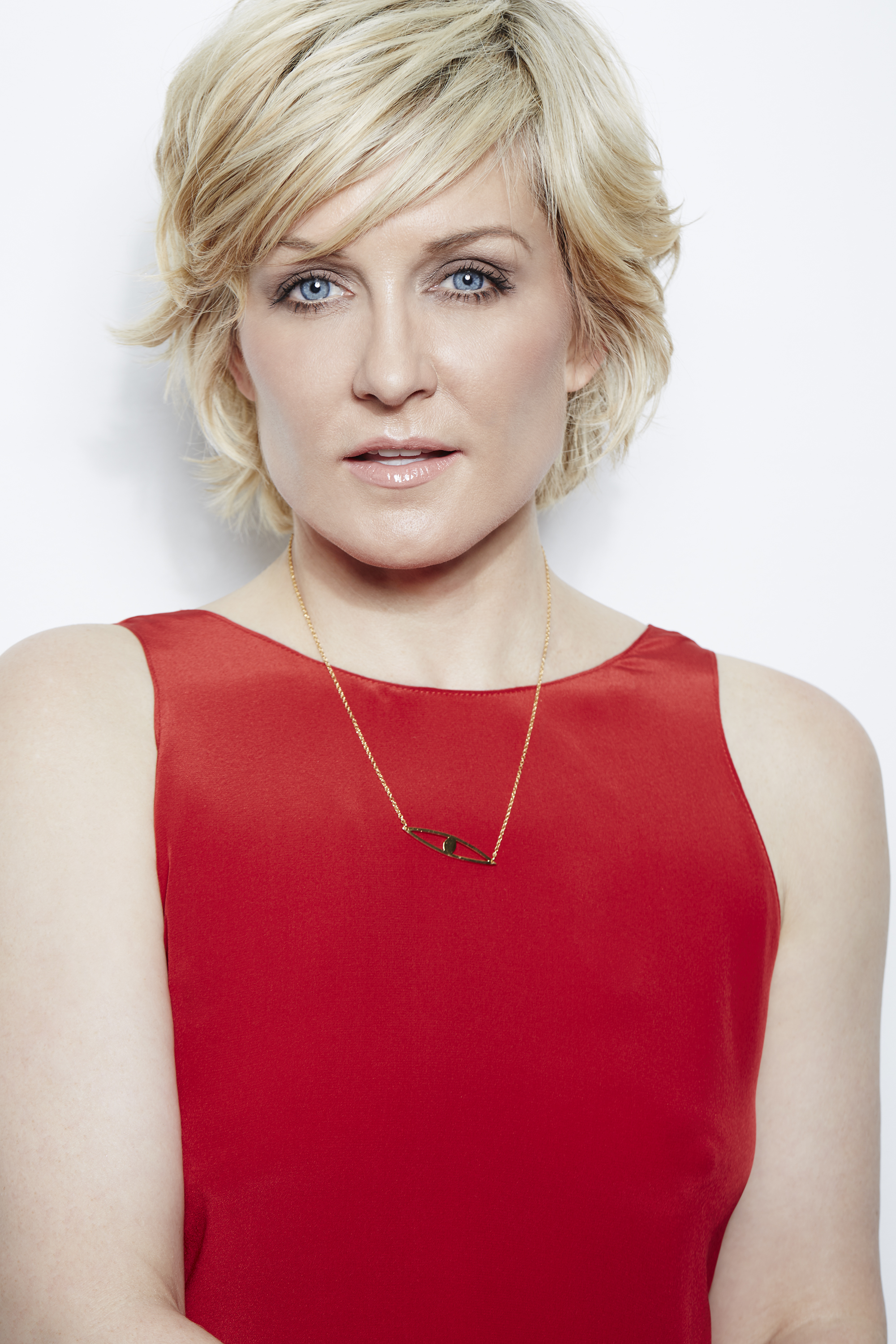
- Carlson in 2015
- Born: Amy Lynn Carlson; July 7, 1968 (age 58); Elmhurst, Illinois, U.S.
- Education: Knox College
- Occupation: Actress
- Years active: 1992–present
- Spouse: Syd Butler (m. 2004)
- Children: 2

Amy Lynn Carlson (born July 7, 1968) is an American actress known for her roles as Linda Reagan in the CBS police procedural Blue Bloods, Alex Taylor on the NBC drama Third Watch, deputy bureau chief ADA Kelly Gaffney in Law & Order: Trial by Jury, and Josie Watts in the NBC daytime soap opera Another World.

== Early life ==
Carlson was born in Elmhurst, DuPage County, Illinois, near Chicago, and was raised in Glen Ellyn, Illinois, the daughter of schoolteacher parents, Barbara Jane (Hultman) and Robert Eugene Carlson. She is of Swedish descent, with roots in Småland.

== Career ==
=== 1986–1992: College and early career ===
Her first acting job was as a background actor in the film Lucas starring Charlie Sheen, Corey Haim, and Winona Ryder. Later she followed her older sister Betsy to Knox College in Galesburg, Illinois. While in college, Carlson was active in the school's theatre department, appearing in Fifth of July, Noises Off, A Lie of the Mind, and The School for Scandal. She directed the play Aunt Dan and Lemon written by Wallace Shawn on her senior year. Carlson graduated cum laude with a degree in East Asian Studies with a concentration in theater.

After graduating college, Carlson moved to Chicago where she studied improv with Charna Halpern at the Harold ImprovOlympic, and took acting classes at The Actor's Center with Victor D'Altorio and Eileen Vorbach. She also appeared in some small theater productions including Dark City, Revenge of the Cheerleader with Warren Leight and Theater of the Film Noir at the Folio Theater Company. She also appeared in three episodes of The Untouchables starring William Forsythe and Tom Amandes. Carlson also appeared in three episodes of Missing Persons with Daniel J. Travanti. She also played in Legacy of Lies a TV movie with Joe Morton.

=== 1993–2003: Television contracts, films and relief work ===
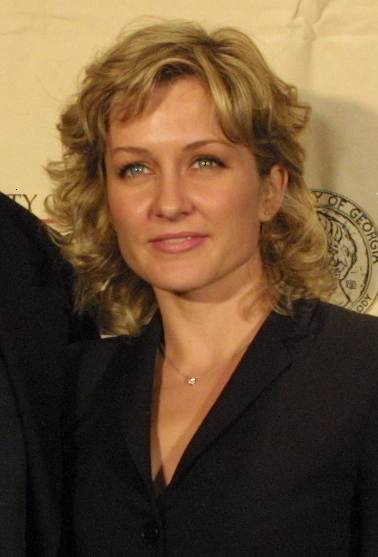
Carlson in 2002

Carlson landed the role of Josie Watts and moved to New York in late December 1993 to make her soap opera debut on Another World. During her first year, she traveled with World Vision to Rwanda to work on an awareness campaign after the war.

Later, she was nominated for a Daytime Emmy Award for Outstanding Supporting Actress in a Drama Series in 1998. After leaving Another World she appeared in Thanks of a Grateful Nation, about Persian Gulf War syndrome.

Carlson moved to Los Angeles in 1998, where she guest-starred in a number of prime time shows including NYPD Blue, had a recurring role on the show Get Real which starred Anne Hathaway and Jesse Eisenberg, and filmed If These Walls Could Talk Part 2 directed by Martha Coolidge. While in LA, she tested against Mariska Hargitay and Angie Harmon for the role that Mariska won in Law & Order: Special Victims Unit. Soon after, she started acting in the CBS TV Series Falcone as Donny Brasco's wife, shot in Toronto. She later started guest starring in Law & Order: SVU and filming independent films such as Winning Girls Through Psychic Mind Control directed by Barry Alexander Brown where she played a singer, with the voice of Regina Spektor.

Between 2000 and 2003 she starred as Alex Taylor in Third Watch.

=== 2004–2017: Prime time highlights and children ===
After leaving Third Watch, Carlson went on to star on Peacemakers, a CSI-inspired show set in the late 1800s, starring opposite Tom Berenger and Peter O'Meara. When the show was not renewed, she worked on several TV shows and films including a Law & Order episode on its 15th season entitled "Dead Wives Club". Soon Dick Wolf was calling to sign her to Law & Order: Trial by Jury where she co-starred alongside Bebe Neuwirth, Jerry Orbach, Kirk Acevedo, Fred Thompson, and Scott Cohen. Carlson continued to work on a variety of film and television roles such as Guest Starring roles on Criminal Minds and Fringe. On 2010, she landed the role of Linda Reagan on Blue Bloods. Carlson continued in the role of Linda through the seventh season of Blue Bloods. During her hiatus, she played Erin Callan, working alongside James Woods in Too Big to Fail, directed by Curtis Hanson from the book written by Andrew Ross Sorkin. She was also written for the role of Christina Cassertes, by her friend David Cross in his directorial debut film, Hits. After seven years on Blue Bloods, Carlson's contract came to an end. In the eighth-season premiere episode, which aired on September 29, 2017, it was revealed that Linda—who was a nurse—had died in a helicopter crash while transporting a patient.

=== 2018–present: Current work ===
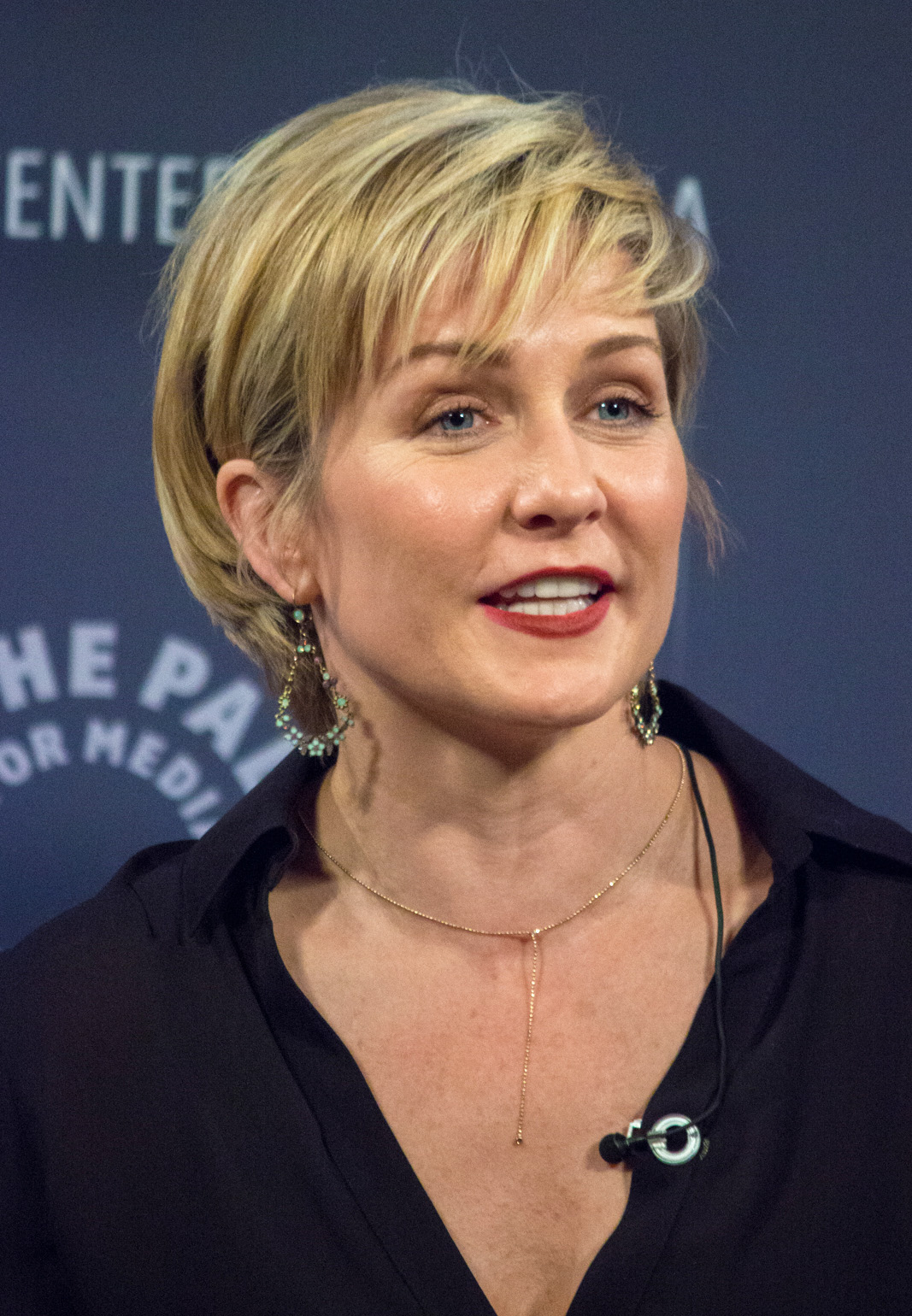
Carlson in 2014

Following Blue Bloods, Carlson worked recurring roles on The Society and The Village. She also shot films Sunny Daze, The Incoherents, A Bread Factory Part One, and the indie horror film Know Fear. Just prior to COVID-19 shutdowns, Carlson co-wrote, directed and starred in a short film, The Letter, co-written by Syd Butler. She cast her friend from Law & Order: Trial by Jury, Scott Cohen, as her co-star. Her work was honored with best director and actor at the Hollywood International Women's Film Festival, as well as awards with the Cannes Indie Film Festival, Hudson Valley Film Festival and Dark Women Film Festival.

During the 2020 pandemic, Carlson and husband Syd Butler along with his bandmate Seth Jabour (Les Savy Fav, The 8G Band), who together form the band Office Romance, finished and released their second album and first full-length album, Holidays of Love.

In 2021, Carlson began shooting as a recurring cast member on FBI: Most Wanted, opposite her friend and co-star from Another World, Julian McMahon.

== Personal life ==
Carlson resides in New York City with her husband Syd Butler. They have two children.

== Awards ==
In 2018, Carlson was presented with the Muhammad Ali Award for Gender Equality. In 2021, she won a Knox College Alumni Achievement Award.

== Filmography ==
=== Film ===
Year	Title	Role	Notes
1992	The Babe	Girl on Stairs	
2000	Everything Put Together	Jane	
2002	Winning Girls Through Psychic Mind Control	Kathy	
2002	Stella Shorts	Hippy Girl	Video
2007	Anamorph	Alexandra Fredericks	
2010	Trio	—N/a	Short film
2011	Green Lantern	Jessica Jordan	
2014	Hits	Christina Casserta	
2015	Sight Unseen	Rachel Sampson	
2016	Natural Selection	Laura	
2017	The Landline	Carla	
2018	A Bread Factory, Part One	Grace	
2020	The Letter		
2024	Peas and Carrots	Laurie	
2026	The Man I Love	Phyllis	

=== Television ===
Year	Title	Role	Notes
1992	Legacy of Lies	Marianna Nania	TV movie
1993	Missing Persons	Helena Brusich	"Pilot", "I'm Gonna Miss Him Too...", & "Right Neighborhood... Wrong Door"
1993–1994	The Untouchables	Various	"Pilot: Parts 1 & 2", "Mind Games"
1993–1998	Another World	Josephine "Josie" Watts	Main role
1998	Thanks of a Grateful Nation	Tammy Boyer	Miniseries
1999	Martial Law	Cassie McGill	"Big Trouble"
1999	Get Real	Dr. Sedgwick	Recurring role
1999	St. Michael's Crossing	Kelly McGloin	TV movie
2000	NYPD Blue	Lisa Marantz	"Along Came Jones"
2000	If These Walls Could Talk 2	Michelle	TV movie
2000	Falcone	n/a	"Windows"
2000	CSI: Crime Scene Investigation	Kate Armstrong	"Friends & Lovers"
2002 & 2024	Law & Order: Special Victims Unit	Patricia Andrews & Katie McGrath	"Asunder" & "Duty to Report"
2000–2003	Third Watch	Alex Taylor	Main role
2002	ER	Alex Taylor	"Brothers and Sisters"
2003	Peacemakers	Katie Owen	Main role
2004	Law & Order	Collette Connolly	"The Dead Wives Club"
2005	Franklin Charter	Maggie Keeler	TV movie
2005–2006	Law & Order: Trial by Jury	A.D.A. Kelly Gaffney	Main role
2006	Drift	Lauren	TV movie
2007	The Kidnapping	Rachel McKenzie	TV movie
2007	NCIS	Karen Sutherland	"Corporal Punishment"
2008	Criminal Minds	Cece Hillenbrand	"Tabula Rasa"
2010	Fringe	Maureen Donovan	"Unearthed"
2010–2017	Blue Bloods	Linda Reagan	Main role
2011	Too Big to Fail	Erin Callan	TV movie
2013	This One Time	n/a	"Amy Carlson"
2016	A Midsummer's Hawaiian Dream	Helen	TV movie
2019	The Village	Julie Tucker	Episode: "In Your Bones"
2019	The Society	Amanda Pressman	Recurring role
2020	FBI: Most Wanted	Jackie Ward	Recurring role
2022	Would I Lie to You? (USA)	Herself	Episode: "Criminal Bear"
2024	Law & Order: SVU	Katie McGrath	Episode: "Duty to Report"
2025	Smoke	Captain Pearson	Episode: "Mirror Mirror"
2026	Daredevil: Born Again	Gloria Blake	Episode: "Requiem"
