= Let's Stay Friends =

Studio album by Les Savy Fav
- Released: September 18, 2007
- Genre: Art punk, indie rock
- Label: Frenchkiss

Les Savy Fav chronology
Inches (2004)	Let's Stay Friends (2007)	After the Balls Drop (2008)

Professional ratings
Aggregate scores
Source	Rating
Metacritic	87/100
Review scores
Source	Rating
AllMusic	4.5/5 stars
The A.V. Club	A−
Entertainment Weekly	A−
MSN Music (Consumer Guide)	A
NME	9/10
Pitchfork	8.3/10
Q	4/5 stars
Rolling Stone	4/5 stars
Spin	3/5 stars
Uncut	4/5 stars

Let's Stay Friends is the fourth album by Les Savy Fav. It was released on September 18, 2007. The album was No. 5 in NME albums of the year list, No. 16 on Rolling Stone's list of the Top 50 Albums of 2007, and No. 44 on Pitchfork's list.

The song "Raging in the Plague Age" is featured in the video game Grand Theft Auto IV.

== Track listing ==
1. "Pots & Pans" – 2:38
2. "The Equestrian" – 3:27
3. "The Year Before the Year 2000" – 2:26
4. "Patty Lee" – 3:51
5. "What Would Wolves Do?" – 2:56
6. "Brace Yourself" – 4:13
7. "Raging in the Plague Age" – 2:43
8. "Slugs in the Shrubs" – 2:40
9. "Kiss Kiss Is Getting Old" – 3:18
10. "Comes & Goes" – 3:01
11. "Scotchgard the Credit Card" – 3:06
12. "The Lowest Bitter" – 4:20

== Credits ==
Les Savy Fav

- Tim Harrington – vocals
- Seth Jabour – guitar
- Andrew Reuland – guitar
- Syd Butler – bass
- Harrison Haynes – drums

Additional personnel

- Toko Yasuda (vocals) – track: 8, 9
- John Schmersal (vocals) – track: 4
- Nicholas Thorburn (vocals) – track: 3, 5
- Eleanor Friedberger (vocals) – track: 10
- Catherine Herrick (vocals) – track: 4
- Chris Zane (drums) – track: 1, 10
- Matt Schulz (drums) – track: 3, 9
- Joe Plummer (drums) – track: 5
- Fred Armisen (drums) – track: 1, 4, 10
- Anawim "Nawi" Avila (saxophone) – track: 8, 12
- Adelquis E. Salom (trumpet) – track: 12
- Jason B. Silva (trombone) – track: 12
- Emily Haines (piano) – track: 10
- Aleah Robinson (violin) – track: 8
