= Pattonville High School =

Public school in Missouri, United States

- Pirate Pete

Location
- 2497 Creve Coeur Mill Road; Maryland Heights, Missouri 63043; United States; 38°44′30″N 90°27′16″W

Information
- Type: Public high school
- Motto: That All Will Learn
- Established: 1933; 93 years ago
- School district: Pattonville School District
- NCES School ID: 292370001421
- Principal: Gene Grimshaw
- Staff: 228
- Teaching staff: 133
- Grades: 9–12
- Enrollment: 1,945 (2024–25)
- Student to teacher ratio: 15.33
- Campus type: Suburban
- Colors: Green and white
- Fight song: On Wisconsin!
- Athletics conference: Suburban Conference
- Mascot: Pirate Pete
- Rival: Ritenour High School
- Newspaper: Pattonville Today
- Yearbook: Echo
- Feeder schools: Pattonville Heights Middle School; Holman Middle School; Academy of Innovation at Remington
- Website: phs.psdr3.org

Pattonville High School is a public high school located in Maryland Heights, Missouri. It is the only high school in the Pattonville School District.

== History ==
In 1937, Pattonville High School's first graduating class consisted of two girls. In 1938, the graduating class grew to four boys and one girl. The original high school was located at the current site of Holman Middle School, behind Pattonville Learning Center at 11055 Saint Charles Rock Road, before relocating to its current campus behind the Champ Landfill. In December 1994, the high school was incorporated into Maryland Heights, Missouri, following a boundary exchange with the village of Champ.

== Demographics ==
Demographics as of 2020:

White	African American	Asian American	Latino	Two or More Races
49%	33%	3%	9%	5%

== Academics ==
All students are required to complete 50 hours of community service in order to receive a diploma. Students at PHS have the opportunity to participate in the Missouri A+ schools program, allowing 2 years of free tuition at any community college in the state of Missouri if grades and attendance requirements are met. PHS offers a variety of Honors and AP Classes that give college credit.

As of 2018, the average ACT score is 21.8 and 89% of students graduate. 68% of graduating students go on to college after graduating, with 43% of graduates going to a 4-year University and 25% going to a 2-year Community College.

== Athletics and activities ==
Pattonville High School offers various sports at freshman, junior varsity and varsity levels.

Students at Pattonville High School have the opportunity to participate in activities:Pattonville fields a competitive marching band, and has had success at the national level in jazz band, jazz ensemble, cheerleading, and robotics.

Boys Athletics

- Baseball
- Basketball
- Cross Country
- Football
- Golf
- Soccer
- Swimming and Diving
- Tennis
- Track and Field
- Volleyball
- Water Polo (co-ed)
- Wrestling

Girls Athletics

- Basketball
- Cross Country
- Field Hockey
- Golf
- Lacrosse
- Soccer
- Softball
- Swimming and Diving
- Tennis
- Track and Field
- Volleyball
- Water Polo (co-ed)
- Wrestling

=== State championships ===
- 1986 Class 4A Baseball
- 1994 Class 4A Softball
- 2012 FTC Robotics
- 2021 FTC Robotics
- 2022 FTC Robotics
- 2024 HOSA
- 2024 Drill Team
- 2024 TSA
- 2025 MORENet Missouri High School Cyber Security Challenge
- 2025 WWT Stem Student Forum

=== National championships ===
- 2025 National Poison Prevention Week Poster Contest

=== World championships ===
- 2012 FTC Robotics World Championship
- 2017 FTC Robotics World Championship

== Notable alumni ==
- Robert L. Behnken '88: NASA astronaut and mission specialist
- Matthew P. Brookman '86: Attorney
- Scott Cooper '86: former Major League Baseball player
- Lavell Crawford '86: Comedian, best known for his recurring role as Huell on AMC's Breaking Bad
- Kaleb Eleby '18: Professional football quarterback
- John Fulgham: Major League Baseball player
- Janet Jones: Actress
- Ken Jones: National Football League player
- Jeannie Kendall: Singer in the father/daughter country music duo The Kendalls
- Gayle McCormick: Lead singer of Smith band and a solo artist
- Chuck McKinley: Wimbledon champion & 1963 Davis Cup-winning professional tennis player
- Sue Meredith '84: three-term Missouri representative from district 71
- Scott Miller '89: Missouri representative from district 69
- Bryan Oelkers: Former MLB player (Minnesota Twins, Cleveland Indians)
- Miguel Pérez '23: MLS player
- Blake Strode: Professional tennis player
- Kimberly Thompson: Professional musician; Former drummer of The 8G Band on Late Night with Seth Meyers
