= After the Balls Drop =

Live album by Les Savy Fav
- Released: April 29, 2008
- Recorded: January 1, 2008
- Venue: Bowery Ballroom; New York City, New York
- Genre: Rock
- Label: Frenchkiss

Les Savy Fav chronology
Let's Stay Friends (2007)	After the Balls Drop (2008)	Root for Ruin (2010)

Professional ratings
Review scores
Source	Rating
Pitchfork	6.4/10

After the Balls Drop is a live album by the New York-based rock band Les Savy Fav. It was recorded at the band's New Year's Eve show in the early morning hours of January 1, 2008, at New York City's Bowery Ballroom.

In addition to original material, the set included a number of cover songs by bands such as Pixies, Misfits, and Creedence Clearwater Revival. After the Balls Drop was released April 29, 2008, on Frenchkiss Records as a digital-only release.

== Track listing ==
1. Equestrian
2. Patty Lee
3. What Would Wolves Do?
4. Sweat Descends
5. Yawn Yawn Yawn
6. We'll Make A Lover Of You
7. The Year Before The Year 2000
8. The Lowest Bitter
9. Who Rocks The Party
10. Tim Speech
11. Hey Tonight (Creedence Clearwater Revival Cover)
12. Debaser (Pixies Cover)
13. Astro Zombies (Misfits Cover)
14. Sliver (Nirvana Cover)
15. Everybody's Gotta Live (Love Cover)

== Personnel ==
- Tim Harrington – vocals
- Seth Jabour – guitar
- Andrew Reuland – guitar
- Syd Butler – bass
- Harrison Haynes – drums
