= Root for Ruin =

Root For Ruin

Studio album by Les Savy Fav
- Released: August 3, 2010 (digital release)
- Genre: Art punk, indie rock, post-punk
- Label: Frenchkiss Records

Les Savy Fav chronology
After the Balls Drop (2008)	Root For Ruin (2010)

Professional ratings
Review scores
Source	Rating
The A.V. Club	(B)
Consequence of Sound	4.5/5 stars
CYAN mag	7/10 stars
One Thirty BPM	(88%)
The Phoenix	3/4 stars
Pitchfork	(7.2/10)
Slant Magazine	3.5/5 stars
Spin	8/10 stars
Sputnikmusic	3/5 stars

Root for Ruin is Les Savy Fav's fifth studio album. Its scheduled release date was September 14, 2010, but after the album leaked in late July it was given a digital release on August 3, 2010.

== Track listing ==
1. “Appetites” - 3:33
2. “Dirty Knails” - 3:06
3. “Sleepless in Silverlake” - 3:41
4. “Let's Get Out of Here” - 3:33
5. “Lips n' Stuff” - 3:48
6. “Poltergeist” - 3:42
7. “High and Unhinged” - 3:53
8. “Excess Energies” - 3:03
9. “Dear Crutches” - 4:13
10. “Calm Down” - 2:46
11. “Clear Spirits” - 3:53

== Credits ==
=== Les Savy Fav ===
- Tim Harrington – vocals
- Seth Jabour – guitar
- Andrew Reuland – guitar
- Syd Butler – bass
- Harrison Haynes – drums
