= Go Forth =

Studio album by Les Savy Fav
- Released: October 2, 2001
- Recorded: May 2001; Mission Sound, Brooklyn
- Genre: Art punk Indie rock
- Length: 45:45
- Label: Frenchkiss Records
- Producer: Phil Ek

Les Savy Fav chronology
Emor: Rome Upside Down EP (2000)	Go Forth (2001)	Inches (2004)

Professional ratings
Review scores
Source	Rating
AllMusic	3/5 stars
Pitchfork	7.6/10
Rock Sound	4/5 stars
Tiny Mix Tapes	4/5 marks

Go Forth is the third album by Les Savy Fav, released in 2001 via Frenchkiss Records. It was mixed in June 2001 at Magic Shop in Manhattan, and was mastered by John Loder at Abbey Road Studios, London.

== Track listing ==
1. "Tragic Monsters" – 3:14
2. "Reprobate's Resumé" – 3:04
3. "Crawling Can Be Beautiful" – 3:00
4. "Disco Drive" – 4:05
5. "The Slip" – 2:54
6. "Daily Dares" – 3:08
7. "One to Three" – 2:48
8. "Pills" – 3:29
9. "Adopduction" – 3:26
10. "No Sleeves" – 4:06
11. "Bloom on Demand" – 6:35
12. "I Hope You Like This-Love LSF" – 2:56

== Personnel ==
All songs by Les Savy Fav:

- Tim Harrington – vocals
- Syd Butler – bass
- Seth Jabour – guitar
- Harrison Hayes – drums

=== Additional personnel ===
- Produced and Engineered by Phil Ek
- Mastered by John Loder
