= Emor (disambiguation) =

Emor is a portion of the Torah.

Emor may refer to:

== People ==
- Emor L. Calkins (1853–1933), American temperance leader
- Aloisio Emor Ojetuk, governor of Eastern Equatoria State of South Sudan

== Other ==
- Emor: Rome Upside Down, 2000 EP by Les Savy Fav
