= Holocene (Portland, Oregon) =

Music venue and nightclub in the United States

- Logo

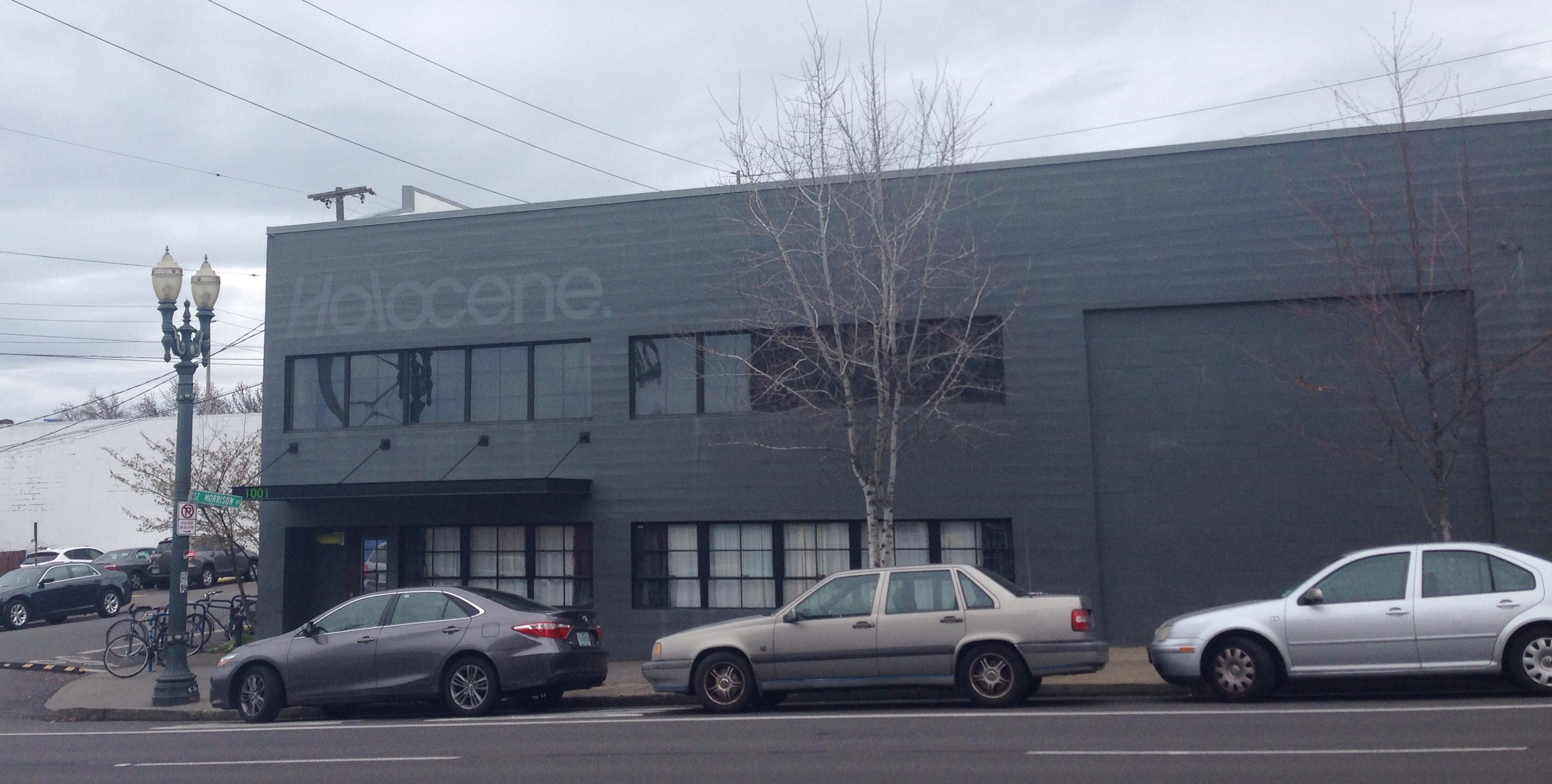
- The exterior in 2016

- Location in Portland, Oregon
- Address: 1001 SE Morrison Street
- Location: Portland, Oregon, U.S.
- Coordinates: 45.5173°N 122.6555°W
- Type: Music venue; nightclub

Construction
- Opened: June 2003

Website
- holocene.org

Holocene is a music venue and nightclub in the Buckman neighborhood of Portland, Oregon, in the United States. The venue, which opened in June 2003, is a former auto-parts warehouse with an industrial, modern interior. Holocene hosts a variety of events, and was named the city's "Best Place to Dance" by Willamette Week readers in 2017.

== Description and history ==
Holocene was established in June 2003 in a former auto-parts warehouse, located at the intersection of Southeast 10th and Morrison, in Portland's Buckman neighborhood. The venue is "dedicated to the avant-garde of the Portland art and music scene, with an über-modern interior". Jon Shadel of The Washington Post described Holocene as a "music and art club with an avant-garde bent... inspired by the minimal techno scene in Berlin". He wrote, "the bi-level venue in the Central Eastside hosts an eclectic range of independent DJs and genre-blurring musicians, although most lineups tend to focus on up-and-coming sounds in electronic, R&B and hip-hop."

The 5,000-square-foot venue has a "stark industrial feel" with two large rooms, a bar, high ceilings and a sunken dance floor, which has been described as a "living room in the midst of a gritty industrial loft". According to Willamette Week's Sophie June, Holocene offers "boozy slushies" and "indie-rock shows that often tend toward the psychedelic or the threateningly abrasive". The bar has cocktails called Claire's Knee and Kiss Kiss Bangkok.

In 2020, Holocene curated Going In, a twenty-track compilation featuring local electronic musicians. The collection raised funds for contributing artists and the venue during the coronavirus pandemic.

=== Events ===
The venue hosts a variety of events, ranging from concerts to weddings. According to Willamette Week's Sophie June, Holocene "began as one of the only spots to bring national-caliber electronic acts to Portland following the fast demise of the B Complex". In her guides to Portland, Rachel Dresbeck said the venue hosts many "musical experiences—secret shows by famous artists, up-and-coming bands that will be famous shortly, veteran and nouveau DJs, house music, shoegaze, modern soul, and other musical attractions keeping hipsters crowding the place".

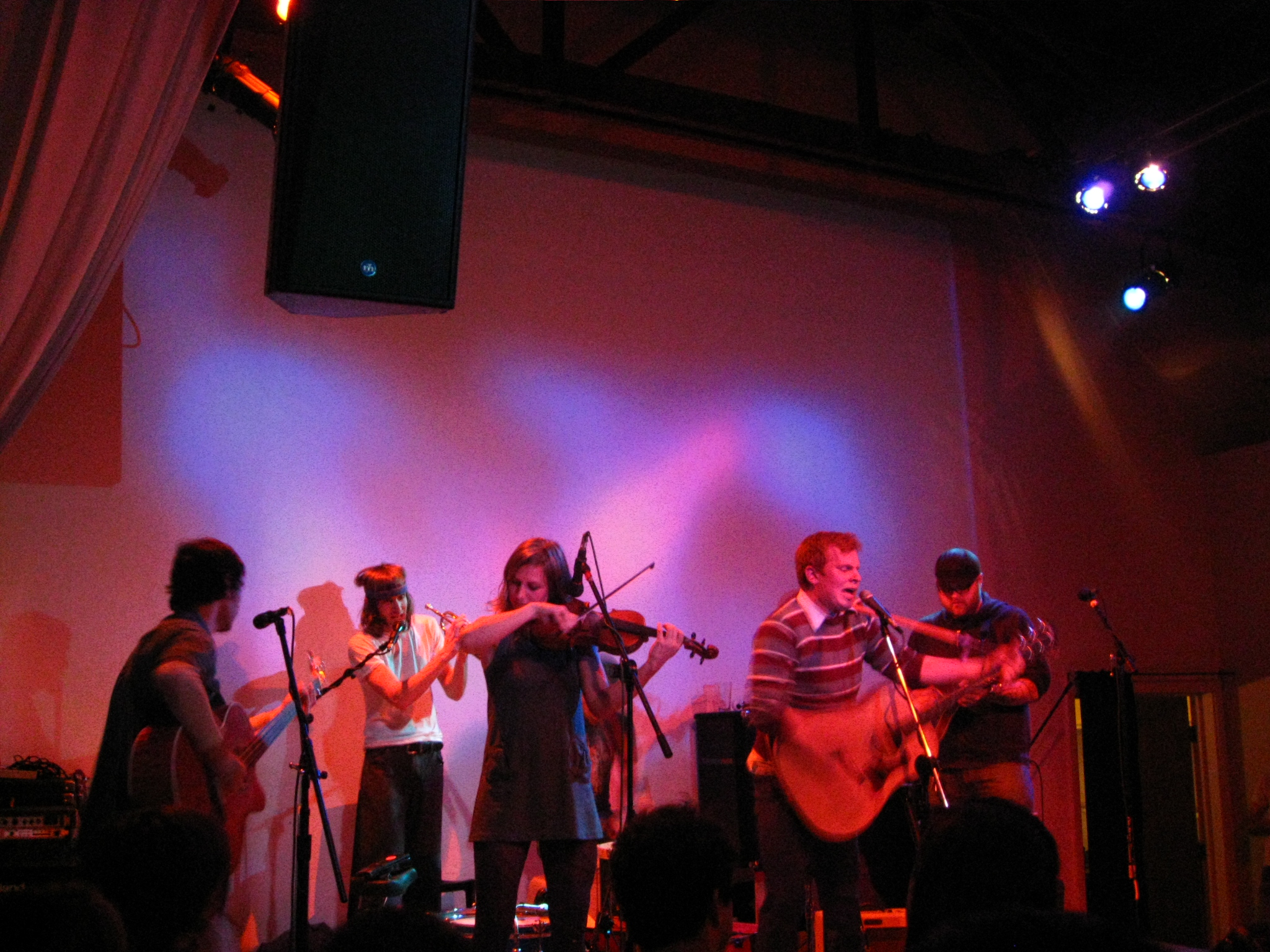
The Builders and the Butchers performing at Holocene in 2007

Musicians who have performed at Holocene include Against the Current, Lauren Aquilina, Au/Ra, Beach Fossils, Ryan Beatty, Kadhja Bonet, Clairo, Crumb, Matthew Dear, Duckwrth, Future Generations, Tommy Genesis, Chuck Inglish, Japanese Breakfast, The Japanese House, Jonna Lee, Milk & Bone, Shy Girls, Sasha Sloan, Snail Mail, Tove Styrke, Avey Tare, and Zaytoven. The venue hosted London Grammar's first concert in Portland. In 2018, Holocene hosted a "Club Kai Kai Pride" event featuring drag performer Aja. The event was part of the "Club Kai Kai" series, which caters to the LGBTQ community and features "a rave-style club scene with plenty of drag royalty, voguing and butterflies for the stomach". The venue has also hosted writers, including Shayla Lawson. In 2019, the Portland-based literary magazine Tin House hosted an event in conjunction with the Association of Writers & Writing Programs (AWP) conference, featuring readings by Hanif Abdurraqib, Erica Dawson, Morgan Parker, and Tommy Pico.

Monthly events include "Double Down" (described as a "hot and sweaty queer-friendly dance party") and "Slay", a "queer-centric" hip-hop event catering to an "intersectional crowd". Recurring dance events include "Cupcake" ("devoted to 'fat folks and allies'") and "Snap!", a 1990s music party "designed to evoke middle-school dances". Others include "Candi Pop" (bubblegum pop), "Emo Nite", "Gaycation", a Rolling Stones–themed party called "Sympathy for the Disco", and another dedicated to Talking Heads. The venue hosted StorySLAM monthly as of 2018.

Holocene hosted the "Ping Pong Pandemonium Party" in mid-2010; participants included Fred Armisen and Carrie Brownstein and Janet Weiss of Sleater-Kinney. More recent tribute events have included "Beyoncé Nicki Rihanna Night", "Holla!: '90s vs Early '00s Rap & RNB Night", "This Party Is Killing You: All Robyn All Night" and "Cake for Drake", where cake was served for Drake's birthday. In 2018, the venue was decorated to resemble the Sunnydale nightclub from Buffy the Vampire Slayer as part of a Halloween celebration and hosted Jo Ann Hardesty's election-results viewing party. Holocene hosted Girl Fest the following year, and was one of several venues screening films as part of the Portland Oregon Women's Film Festival (POW Fest).

== Reception ==
Holocene's exterior in 2026

In 2003, The Oregonian's Grant Butler wrote, "Holocene is anything but a hollow scene. The name of this cavernous eastside nightclub isn't an ironic statement about the state of Portland's nightlife. In fact, it relates to a prehistoric geological era. Maybe there's some deep meaning at work, but what's certain is how rock-solid this place is as an after-hours hangout." He said Holocene hosted Bill Shannon's post-performance party during the Time-Based Art Festival, and wrote of the venue:

Even when there's not a party going on, Holocene has sexy allure. DJs spin electronic magic while projected digital images fill the two-story walls. As cocktails flow, sleek-looking and elegantly garnished dishes come out of the kitchen. Back in the smoking lounge, smartly dressed scenesters lounge on puffy couches and drink in that room's ever-changing art installation.

David Greenwald of The Oregonian wrote in 2014, "If there's a dance party in Portland, it's probably happening at Holocene, which is routinely home to laptop experimenters, DJs spinning hip-hop classics and LGBT-friendly events such as the monthly Gaycation." Queerty included the venue on its 2016 "5 Nightlife Gems You Can Only Find in Portland" list. Willamette Week readers named Holocene the city's "Best Place to Dance" in 2017. The newspaper's Sophie June wrote:

Holocene is maybe the best spot to go for some bump-and-grind—especially outside the Old Town zone. There's a photo booth and tall white ceilings, and it's really one of the only appropriate places in the city to do Molly on a random Saturday night. Beware that it's sweaty and you'll probably see the younger sibling of someone you went to high school with, which isn't always great.

In 2018, Willamette Week's Walker MacMurdo wrote: "Fifteen years in, whether Holocene is hosting a dream-pop trio, a live podcast or its birthday party for Drake, it still feels like the coolest place in Portland." According to the newspaper's Shannon Gormley, Holocene "feels like an intimate warehouse party on any given night". Willamette Week has also reported that the venue "regularly feels like a warehouse party if warehouse parties were kind of cozy." In his 2019 local guide of Portland, The Washington Post's Jon Shadel wrote, "Among concert halls in Portland, Holocene presents the most timely survey of the local scene. And with a calendar full of themed dance nights — such as the queer- and BIPOC-focused Slay — there's something going on nearly every night of the week." Holocene earned second place in the "Best Place to Dance" category of Willamette Week's "Best of Portland Readers' Poll 2020". It won in the same category in 2025.

== See also ==
- Culture of Portland, Oregon
