= Son of the Tiger =

Studio album by The Big Sleep
- Released: September 19, 2006
- Genres: Indie rock, shoegaze
- Length: 45:10
- Label: French Kiss Records
- Producers: Kevin McMahon and The Big Sleep

The Big Sleep chronology
| You Today, Me Tomorrow | Son of the Tiger |

Son of the Tiger is the first full-length album by The Big Sleep and their first to be released by French Kiss Records. It was released in September 2006 and has a total length of 45:10.

== Reviews ==
Son of the Tiger has been described in Stylus Magazine as having some flaws but overall as "compulsively and lastingly listenable". while in the Washington Post it was called one of the more appealing examples in its genre.

== Track listing ==
1. "Brown Beauty" - 3:54
2. "Murder" - 4:22
3. "You Can't Touch the Untouchable" - 3:59
4. "SKB" - 3:36
5. "Menemy" - 4:37
6. "Locomotion" - 4:30
7. "Are You Ready (For Love)?" - 4:00
8. "Shima" - 4:22
9. "Son of the Tiger" - 4:39
10. "New Strings" - 7:11
