= Detachment Kit =

American indie rock band

- Origin: Chicago, United States
- Genres: Indie rock
- Years active: 1999–present
- Labels: Frenchkiss, Self-Starter Foundation, spinArt
- Members: Ian Menard; Charlie Davis III; Bryan Mayer; Nick Davis
- Past members: Michael Hamilton; Toddrick Spalding; Josh Hight

Detachment Kit is an American indie rock band formed in 1999.

== History ==
Detachment Kit was started in Chicago, IL in 1999, by Toddrick Spalding (drums), Josh Hight (bass guitar), and Ian Menard (vocals, guitar, previously of Caesar's Glass Box). Toddrick met Charlie Davis III through his roommates and the band was completed. They were all art school students, Hight (video/film) and Spalding (graphic design) attended Columbia College and Menard (painting/photography) and Charlie H. Davis III (lead guitar/painting/drawing) attended Art Institute of Chicago.

The band recorded a demo soon after the line up congealed which was released as the Attacks On Bright America EP in 2001 on limited 10" vinyl on Chris Newmyer's Self-Starter Foundation label. The follow-up full-length album They Raging. Quiet Army was recorded in two days at Steve Albini's Electrical Audio by engineer Greg Norman and also released on Self-Starter Foundation (it was subsequently re-released on spinArt Records and Bad News Records in Japan). The album was a hit on college radio.

The band toured relentlessly and built a loyal fanbase. Spalding and Hight left the band during the writing of their second album, so Davis and Menard continued on to make the record Of This Blood..., recorded by Greg Norman, on which Menard played guitar and drums and Davis played bass and guitar. The band relocated to Brooklyn, New York, and recruited the rhythm section of Michael Hamilton (drums) and Bryan Mayer (bass guitar) for live performances. In 2005, Nick Davis replaced Michael Hamilton on drums. Original Detachment Kit bass player Josh Hight later went on to form IRONS.

In January 2010, Menard and Charlie Davis started a new band with Jess Birch (of Watchers) called BRONZE, releasing their self-titled debut EP in May 2010.

Detachment Kit toured extensively, playing on the same bill as bands such as Les Savy Fav, Sparta, Thursday, My Morning Jacket, Burning Brides, The Walkmen, Hot Hot Heat, Coheed and Cambria, Cursive, Guided by Voices, The Dismemberment Plan, and Jimmy Eat World.

== Musical style ==
The band's sound is influenced by post-punk bands, with Gang of Four and Wire identified as influences, and their sound described as "peppered with smart references to post-punk and indie's hallowed past". Some tracks on Of This Blood were described as "a sort of post-punk blues". The band has drawn comparisons with Pixies, Les Savy Fav, Built To Spill and Modest Mouse.

== Discography ==
=== Albums ===
- They Raging Quiet Army (2002), Self-Starter
- Of This Blood (2004), Frenchkiss
- Live at Cat's Cradle 16 September 2004, Download only
- Plus (2006), Self-released

=== EPs ===
- Attacks on Bright America (2001), Self-Starter
