= Inches (album) =

Compilation album by Les Savy Fav
- Released: April 20, 2004
- Recorded: 1995–2004
- Length: 1:10:28
- Label: Frenchkiss Records

Les Savy Fav chronology
Go Forth (2001)	Inches (2004)	Let's Stay Friends (2007)

Professional ratings
Aggregate scores
Source	Rating
Metacritic	84/100
Review scores
Source	Rating
AllMusic	4/5 stars
Alternative Press	3/5 stars
Cokemachineglow	81%
Drowned in Sound	9/10
The Fly	4/5 stars
Pitchfork	9.1/10
Spin	B
Stylus	8/10
Tiny Mix Tapes	5/5 stars
Under the Radar	6/10

Inches is a compilation album by Les Savy Fav. Initial pressings of the CD came with a DVD featuring live performances, music videos and photos.

The album is a collection of singles from 1995–2004, containing many songs that were previously available on vinyl only. Among the tracks is "The Sweat Descends," which later became a single and was placed on several Best of 2004 rankings. "Meet Me in the Dollar Bin" is a song about one-hit wonders and bands that fall out of style. The song "Reformat" is recorded in two versions: a live version from a concert with fans providing extra vocals and a six-minute 'radio play' about a submarine captain who is executed by guillotine in a football stadium.

== Track listing ==
1. "Meet Me in the Dollar Bin" – 4:21
2. "Hold On to Your Genre" – 5:16
3. "We'll Make a Lover of You" – 3:43
4. "Fading Vibes" – 3:58
5. "The Sweat Descends" – 4:15
6. "Knowing How the World Works" – 4:49
7. "Hello Halo, Goodbye Glands" – 3:53
8. "Obsessed With The Excess" – 4:05
9. "One Way Widow" – 3:18
10. "Yawn, Yawn, Yawn" – 2:56
11. "No Sleeves" – 4:14
12. "Reprobates Resume" – 3:23
13. "Reformat (Live)" – 6:10
14. "Reformat (Dramatic Reading)" – 2:55
15. "Bringing Us Down" – 3:04
16. "Our Coastal Hymn" – 4:20
17. "Blackouts on Thursday" – 3:27
18. "Rodeo" – 2:20
