= 3/5 =

3/5 or 3/5 may refer to:

- The fraction, 3/5
- 3/5 (album), a 1997 album by Les Savy Fav
- March 5, month-day date notation
- 3 May, day-month date notation
- 3rd Battalion 5th Marines, an infantry battalion in the United States Marine Corps
- Three-fifths Compromise, American legislation for determining the proportional value of slaves in pre-Civil War census counts
- Three-fifths majority, a supermajority used in some political votes

== See also ==
- 5/3 (disambiguation)
- 6/10 (disambiguation)
