= 3/5 (album) =

- Cover to the standard edition of the album

Studio album by Les Savy Fav
- Released: July 1, 1997
- Genre: Post-hardcore, emo
- Length: 32:28
- Label: Self-Starter Foundation
- Producer: James Murphy with Nicholas Vernhes

Les Savy Fav chronology
3/5 (1997)	The Cat and the Cobra (1999)

Alternative cover

Professional ratings
Review scores
Source	Rating
Allmusic	4/5 stars
Pitchfork	(7.6/10)

3/5 is the debut album by Les Savy Fav. It was released in 1997 by Self-Starter Foundation. The Long Play (LP) release came in a pack of shower caps and is fairly difficult to find, sometimes fetching high prices on eBay. Coincidentally, only three-fifths of the line-up on this album, the band's first, remain in the present-day line-up, as drummer Patrick Mahoney was replaced by Harrison Haynes before the group's second album, The Cat and the Cobra, and guitarist Gibb Slife left before the recording of the Emor: Rome Upside Down EP.

Having gone out of print, the album was re-issued in 2006, on the Frenchkiss label, minus the shower caps.

== Track listing ==
No.	Title	Length
1.	"Intro"	3:15
2.	"New Teen Anthem"	2:53
3.	"Cut It Out"	2:23
4.	"Pluto"	2:49
5.	"Cassolette"	2:52
6.	"Scout's Honor"	3:13
7.	"Je T'Aime"	4:57
8.	"Raise Buildings"	2:53
9.	"Blackouts"	3:16
10.	"False Starts"	4:15

== Credits ==
- Tim Harrington (vocals)
- Gibb Slife (guitar)
- Patrick Mahoney (drums)
- Seth Thom Jabour (guitar)
- Syd Butler (bass guitar)
