= Kimberly Thompson =

American drummer and music educator

- Also known as: Kim Thompson
- Born: Los Angeles, California, U.S.
- Origin: St. Louis, Missouri
- Instrument: Drums
- Labels: KTMUSIC Productions

Kimberly Ilana Thompson is an American drummer and music educator.

== Early life ==
Kimberly Ilana Thompson was born in Los Angeles, California, and raised in St. Louis, MO. She began playing drums at the age of ten. She attended Pattonville High School and was the drummer in the school band. She graduated from the Manhattan School of Music in 2003 with a bachelor's degree in jazz composition.

== Career ==
Thompson is the President of the female founded KTMUSICPRODUCTIONS, a record label based in Harlem, New York. She has released all her albums via the label, the first being Like Clockwork, in 2010. Her latest album, Treasures Abound (A Tribute to the Jazz Greats), was released in April 2016 and features her dynamic drumming, showcasing modern themed classical etudes and original jazz songs written and performed with her jazz quartet. She has served as session or touring drummer with several artists, including Beyoncé and fusion guitarist Mike Stern. She has played with The 8G Band on the NBC talk show Late Night with Seth Meyers and has performed with the Kimberly Thompson Quartet at New York's Jazz and Colors festival. Thompson is currently completing a musical produced by The Dodgers and Tommy Mottola on Broadway for “The Donna Summers Project”. She also appeared in Romy & Michelle, a stage adaptation of the 1997 film Romy and Michele's High School Reunion, in Seattle in June 2017.

== Discography ==
- Like Clockwork (2010)
- Dreamcatcher (2011)
- Red Glory (2013)
- A Childs Eyes (2014)
- Live at Marians (2014)
- Treasures Abound (2016)

With Kenny Barron

- Images (Sunnyside, 2003)
