= Emor: Rome Upside Down =

EP by Les Savy Fav
- Released: July 18, 2000
- Genre: Art punk Post-hardcore; Post-punk
- Length: 17:45
- Label: Southern Records

Les Savy Fav chronology
The Cat and the Cobra (1999)	Emor: Rome Upside Down (2000)	Go Forth (2001)

Emor: Rome Upside Down is the only EP by Les Savy Fav, released in 2000. It was released by Southern Records.

It marks a turning point in the band's sound, partially due to the departure of former guitarist Gibb Slife. Synths and more angular line-driven guitar work expand on the already established punk from their two previous albums, 3/5 and The Cat and the Cobra.

== Reception ==
Professional ratings
Review scores
Source	Rating
AllMusic	4/5 stars
Pitchfork	8.7/10

The online music magazine Pitchfork placed Emor: Rome Upside Down at number 164 on their list of top 200 albums of the 2000s.

== Track listing ==
1. "I.C. Timer" – 2:40
2. "Asleepers Union" – 5:12
3. "In These Woods" – 3:02
4. "Hide Me from Next February" – 2:51
5. "Rome" – 4:00

== Personnel ==
- Tim Harrington – vocals
- Harrison Haynes – drums
- Seth Jabour – guitar
- Syd Butler – bass
- Nicolas Vernhes – engineer
