= Twen (band) =

American band

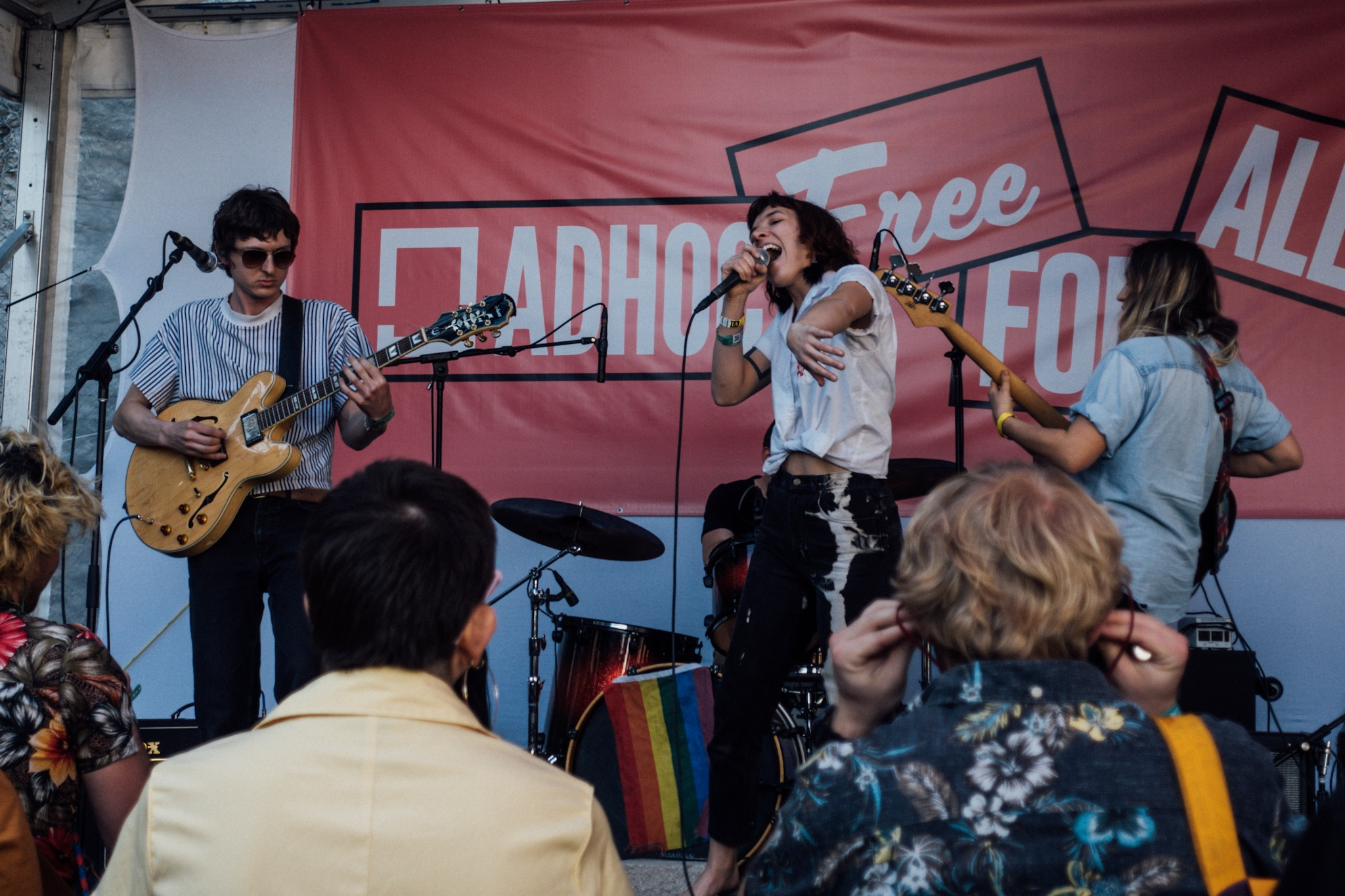
- Twen performing at SXSW in March 2019

Background information
- Origin: Boston, Massachusetts, U.S.
- Genres: rock; indie rock; pop-rock; dream pop; psychedelic rock
- Years active: 2016–present
- Label: Frenchkiss Records
- Members: Jane Fitzsimmons; Ian Jones
- Website: twenband.com

Twen (often stylized in all caps as TWEN) is an American rock band formed in 2016 in Boston, Massachusetts. The band is composed of vocalist Jane Fitzsimmons and guitarist Ian Jones, who also produces the band's music.

== History ==
=== Formation and Awestruck (2016–2019) ===
Jane Fitzsimmons and Ian Jones formed the band after meeting through the Boston DIY music scene; Fitzsimmons operated a basement venue called Womb where local bands including Vundabar and Tacocat performed. The band is named after the German magazine of the same name, a slang term for people in their twenties. In August 2016, the band recorded the EP TWEN LIVE '16, which was released in October of the same year. Shortly after the recording session, Fitzsimmons and Jones moved to Nashville, Tennessee. TWEN LIVE '16 featured drummer Jeff Crenshaw and bassist Cory Best. Twen performed at South by Southwest in March 2019.

The band began touring locally after relocating to Nashville having only released their live EP. Twen's debut album Awestruck was released under Frenchkiss Records on September 20, 2019.

=== One Stop Shop (2022–2025) ===
One Stop Shop was written in Ossipee, New Hampshire in the summer of 2021. The band self-published the LP on July 22, 2022 under their label Twenterprises. Drummers Luke Fedorko and Wolfgang Zimmerman each contributed performances to several songs on the album.

=== Fate Euphoric (2025–present) ===
Twen's third album, Fate Euphoric, was released on November 4, 2025. Session musicians Forrest Raup and Asher Horton contributed musical performances; Raup as drummer and Horton as an additional guitarist on the tracks "Godlike", "Allnighter" & "Fate Euphoric".

== Musical style and influences ==
Twen's music has been described by the music press as indie rock, dream pop, and psychedelic rock. In interviews following the release of Fate Euphoric, the band cited lo-fi producer Nujabes and folk acts such as Lal Waterson and Fairport Convention as musical influences. Fate Euphoric's sound has been described as emulating Britpop and new wave; the band also cited British acts The Verve, Oasis, and Blur as inspirations behind One Stop Shop. The psychedelic-influenced sound of their 2024 single "Lucky Onze" was inspired by Limp Bizkit, Sugar Ray, Smash Mouth, and "early 2000s pop". Jones cited the Red Hot Chili Peppers as an inspiration for the guitar riff on their track "Automation" from One Stop Shop.

Fitzsimmons and Jones are inspired by cinema, especially Turner Classic Movies. The band stated that the 1971 film The Boy Friend starring Twiggy was an inspiration behind the music video for the track "Allnighter".
