= The Cat and the Cobra =

Studio album by Les Savy Fav
- Released: October 19, 1999
- Recorded: June 9–18, 1999
- Genres: Art punk Post-hardcore post-punk
- Length: 49:47
- Label: Frenchkiss Records/Self-Starter Foundation
- Producer: Nicolas Vernhes

Les Savy Fav chronology
3/5 (1997)	The Cat and the Cobra (1999)	Emor: Rome Upside Down EP (2000)

Professional ratings
Review scores
Source	Rating
AllMusic	4/5 stars
Kerrang!	4/5 stars
Pitchfork	8.6/10

The Cat and the Cobra is the second album by Les Savy Fav. It was the first CD released by Frenchkiss Records, bassist Syd Butler's label. The vinyl LP was released by Self-Starter Foundation.

The first track, "The Orchard," features guest backing vocals by Toko Yasuda, who went on to play in Enon.

== Track listing ==
1. "The Orchard" – 3:19
2. "We've Got Boxes" – 3:59
3. "Who Rocks the Party" – 2:31
4. "Wake Up!" – 3:21
5. "Roadside Memorial" – 6:20
6. "Dishonest Don, Pt. I" – 1:34
7. "Dishonest Don, Pt. II" – 3:57
8. "The End" – 3:22
9. "This Incentive" – 3:19
10. "Reformat" – 3:12
11. "Titan"/"Our Coastal Hymn (live, hidden track)" – 14:53

== Credits ==
- Tim Harrington (vocals)
- Gibb Slife (guitar)
- Harrison Haynes (drums)
- Seth Jabour (guitar)
- Syd Butler (bass guitar)
