= Animal Scream =

American rock band

- Origin: Pittsburgh, Pennsylvania, USA
- Genres: Evil Motown
- Years active: 2019–present
- Labels: American Hermitage; Frenchkiss Records
- Members: Chad Monticue; Josh Sickels

Animal Scream is a rock band formed in Pittsburgh, Pennsylvania, in 2019. Animal Scream's debut album Nightwalk was released on July 24, 2020, on American Hermitage records.

== History ==
=== As 1,2,3 ===
Chad Monticue and Josh Sickels both played in the band 1,2,3 along with Nic Snyder and Mike Yamamoto. Their first album New Heaven released on Frenchkiss Records garnered critical review, including a 6.3 from Pitchfork and being named The Guardian's new band of the week.

In 2014 they released their second album Big Weather, a double album that took a significant toll on the band in creating it. At points Snyder said he was going to quit the band. Soon after the record's release, the band went on hiatus.

=== Reformation ===
With Snyder and Yamamoto moving on to other things, Monticue and Sickels still wanted to make music together, moving forward with a new band, Animal Scream. Originally their debut album was supposed to be released in April 2020, to go along with an extensive tour schedule, but the COVID-19 pandemic put touring plans to a stop as well as delayed the album's release. Recorded by Monticue in his home studio, produced by Animal Scream and mixed by Jake Hanner, their debut LP Nightwalk was released July 24 on American Hermitage Records. The album hit the 7th spot on the NACC chart where it remained in the top 200 for the next three months.

== Current members ==
- Chad Monticue – lead vocals, bass, synth, guitars (2019–present)
- Josh Sickels – drums, percussion (2019–present)

=== Albums ===
- Nightwalk (July 24, 2020), American Hermitage

Track List
1. "Black Magic Wind" - 2:08
2. "American Dreams" - 3:10
3. "Let Me In" - 3:22
4. "Station To Station" - 3:43
5. "Evil Motown" - 2:54
6. "Monsters" - 2:33
7. "Ride Or Die" - 3:16
8. "Blood In The Trap" - 2:14
9. "Animal Screams" - 4:31
10. "While We Sleep" - 2:53
11. "I Am The Dreamer" - 4:30
12. "Nightwalk" - 5:14

=== Singles ===
- "Let Me In" (2020)
- "Station to Station" (2020)
- "Black Magic Wind" (2020)
- "Monsters" (2020)
