= The 8G Band =

Former house band for Late Night with Seth Meyers

The 8G Band was the house band for Late Night with Seth Meyers from 2014 to 2024. The band was led by Fred Armisen, and was named for the studio where the show was filmed.

== Inception ==
Armisen assembled the 8G Band about two weeks before the test show. He texted friends Seth Jabour, Syd Butler, and Eli Janney ("What are you guys doing this week?"), then found first drummer Kimberly Thompson through an audition. Jabour and Butler are members of the Brooklyn rock and roll band Les Savy Fav, and Butler also owns Frenchkiss Records. Guitarist Marnie Stern was a member of the band from 2014–2022.

== 2024 layoffs ==
Due to budget cuts, the band was laid off at the end of the 2023–2024 season. The show will continue to use and occasionally update pre-recorded music by the band for use on the show as musical intros and outros but Late Night will no longer have live music as a regular component. The band's final live performance on the show was Hüsker Dü's song "Makes No Sense at All", featuring original Dü member Bob Mould on August 22.

== Members in 2024 ==
- Fred Armisen (bandleader, rhythm guitar, drums)
- Seth Jabour (lead guitar)
- Syd Butler (bass)
- Eli Janney (keyboards)

== Previous members ==
- Kimberly Thompson (drums)
- Kristina Schiano (drums)
- Marnie Stern (lead/rhythm guitar)
