= The Big Sleep (band) =

- Origin: Brooklyn, New York, U.S.
- Genres: Indie rock, shoegaze, post-rock
- Years active: 2003–present
- Label: French Kiss Records
- Members: Sonya Balchandani; Danny Barria; Gabe Rhodes
- Website: Official Website

The Big Sleep are an American three-piece band based in Brooklyn, New York. The band consists of Sonya Balchandani (bass/vocals), Danny Barria (guitar/vocals), and Gabe Rhodes (drums). The Big Sleep are signed to French Kiss Records.

== History ==
Formed in 2003, the band's discography includes the self-released EP You Today, Me Tomorrow, the full-length Son Of The Tiger LP (released in late 2006), the full-length album Sleep Forever (released in 2008), and the album Nature Experiments (2012). Having drawn comparisons to fellow New Yorkers Sonic Youth, The Big Sleep's sound deviates from that of more recently formed contemporaries. Often without vocals, The Big Sleep's songs are for the most part instrumentals leaning towards post-rock or shoegaze, however often with a psychedelic feel hearkening back to classic rock such as Led Zeppelin or Black Sabbath.

In fall 2011, The Big Sleep performed at CMJ Music Marathon and released “Ace”, the single from their new album Nature Experiments. Nature Experiments was released on January 31, 2012.

== Discography ==
=== Albums ===
Title	Release date
Son of the Tiger	September 19, 2006
Sleep Forever	February 19, 2008
Nature Experiments	January 31, 2012

=== Nature Experiments ===
No.	Title	Length
1.	"No. 1"
2.	"Ace"
3.	"Valentine"
4.	"Ghosts In Bodies"
5.	"Wood On The Water"
6.	"Red Carpet"
7.	"Ladders"
8.	"Four Wishes"
9.	"Meet Your Maker"
10.	"1001"
11.	"Sugar"
12.	"Popcorn Soda Candy"
