= 5/3 =

5/3 may refer to:

- May 3 (month-day date notation)
- March 5 (day-month date notation)
- Fifth Third Bank, American bank

== See also ==
- 3/5 (disambiguation)
