= Winning Girls Through Psychic Mind Control =

- Directed by: Barry Alexander Brown
- Written by: Dan Harnden
- Produced by: Joel Barkow; Dan Harnden; Terry Welch
- Starring: Bronson Pinchot; Ruben Santiago-Hudson
- Cinematography: Ian Dudley; Scott Maher
- Edited by: K.A. Chisholm
- Music by: Adam Asarnow; Steve Ferrone; Bill Simms Jr.
- Production company: Cannery Filmworks
- Release date: June 9, 2002 (Seattle)
- Running time: 93 minutes
- Country: United States
- Language: English

Winning Girls Through Psychic Mind Control is a 2002 American comedy film directed by Barry Alexander Brown and starring Bronson Pinchot and Ruben Santiago-Hudson.

== Cast ==
- Bronson Pinchot as Devon Sharpe
- Ruben Santiago-Hudson as Samuel Menendez
- Amy Carlson as Kathy
- Christopher Murney as Albert
- Amy Wright as Psychiatrist
- Larry Clarke as Bob
- Lana Quintal as Camilla
- Lauren Braddock as Sarah
- Stuart Zamsky as Drunk on steps
- Kimberley Wurster as Store Owner/Complaining Wife
- Henry Yuk as Maintenance Guy
- Hugh Karraker as Father of the Bride
- Lucia Grillo as Woman on Bench
- June Leroy as Woman asking life's purpose
- Regina Spektor as Girl who lost ring

== Reception ==
The film has a 60% rating on Rotten Tomatoes. Maitland McDonagh of TV Guide awarded the film three stars out of five.
