= Pattonville School District =

School district in Missouri, United States

Coordinates: 38.736701°N 90.395288°W

Location
- 11097 St. Charles Rock Road, St. Ann 63074 St. Louis County United States
- Coordinates: 38.736701, -90.395288

District information
- Motto: A Great Place to Live, Learn and Grow
- Established: 1879
- Superintendent: Dr. Tim Pecoraro (2018 - 2020); Dr. Barry Nelson (2021-Current)
- Schools: 10
- Budget: $88,620,000 (2015-16)
- NCES District ID: 2923700

Students and staff
- Students: 6056 (2018-19)
- Teachers: 440.79 FTE
- Staff: 142.44 FTE
- Student–teacher ratio: 13.74
- Athletic conference: Suburban XII
- District mascot: Pirate Pete
- Colors: green and white

Other information
- Website: www.psdr3.org

Pattonville R-III School District is a public school district in the suburbs of mid and north St. Louis County, Missouri.

== About ==
Pattonville consists of 27 square miles (70 km^{2}) and it encompasses parts of the municipalities of Bridgeton, Maryland Heights, St. Ann, and a small portion of Creve Coeur. Other portions are in unincorporated St. Louis County (between Creve Coeur and Overland). The district is located near St. Louis Lambert International Airport. The district has won several awards related to the academic success of its students.

The district contains five elementary schools, one K-8 school, two middle schools, and one high school. Current enrollment exceeds 5,000 students. Pattonville boasts a progressive program called Positive School, which is an alternative high school that is largely separated from the rest of the school. Positive School's purpose is to ensure that students who would otherwise drop out finish their high school education. The high school was named to U.S. News & World Report's Best High Schools lists in 2013, 2015, 2019 and 2020. Pattonville spends over $14,000 per student and is ranked the most diverse school district in Missouri by Niche.

== List of schools ==
=== Elementary ===
- Bridgeway, located in Bridgeton
- Drummond, located in St. Ann
- Parkwood, located in Maryland Heights.
- The Academy of Innovation at Remington, located in Maryland Heights.
- Rose Acres, located in Maryland Heights
- Willow Brook, located in Creve Coeur

=== Middle schools ===
- Holman Middle School, located in St. Ann
- Pattonville Heights Middle School, located in Maryland Heights
- The Academy of Innovation at Remington, located in Maryland Heights.

=== High school ===
- Pattonville High School, located in Maryland Heights

=== Alternative ===
- Pattonville Positive School (located in Pattonville High School)

=== Former schools ===
- Carrollton Elementary School (shut down in 2002) was located in Bridgeton
- Carrollton Oaks Elementary School (shut down in 2002) was also located in Bridgeton. Both schools were bought out by St. Louis Lambert International Airport and were replaced by Drummond Elementary School
- Pattonville Elementary School was located on Fee Fee Road near the intersection of St. Charles Rock Road. It was replaced by Parkwood Elementary starting in the 1967 school year
- St. Ann Elementary School was located on St. Bridget Lane in St. Ann next to the Airway Drive In
- Penn Elementary School (a one-room school), located on Old St Charles Rock Rd was closed in the 1940s
- Junction Elementary School (a one-room school) on McKelvey Road (at Vigus Quarry) was closed in 1954
- Penn Junction School opened in 1955 and was closed in the 1980s. It was named for the two schools that it replaced. The building is currently used as a Christian school and is located about a half mile east of the current high school
- Mt. Pleasant Elementary School was located on Warson Road at Kratky Lane near Lindbergh Boulevard. It closed in 1978, but the building remains standing and as of 2019, is owned by a nearby church
- Bridgeton School was closed in the 1980s
- Briar Crest, located in Unincorporated St. Louis County

=== Surrounding Districts ===
Pattonville's neighboring districts include Hazelwood, Parkway, Ladue and Ritenour.
