= Hello Mary =

American alternative rock band

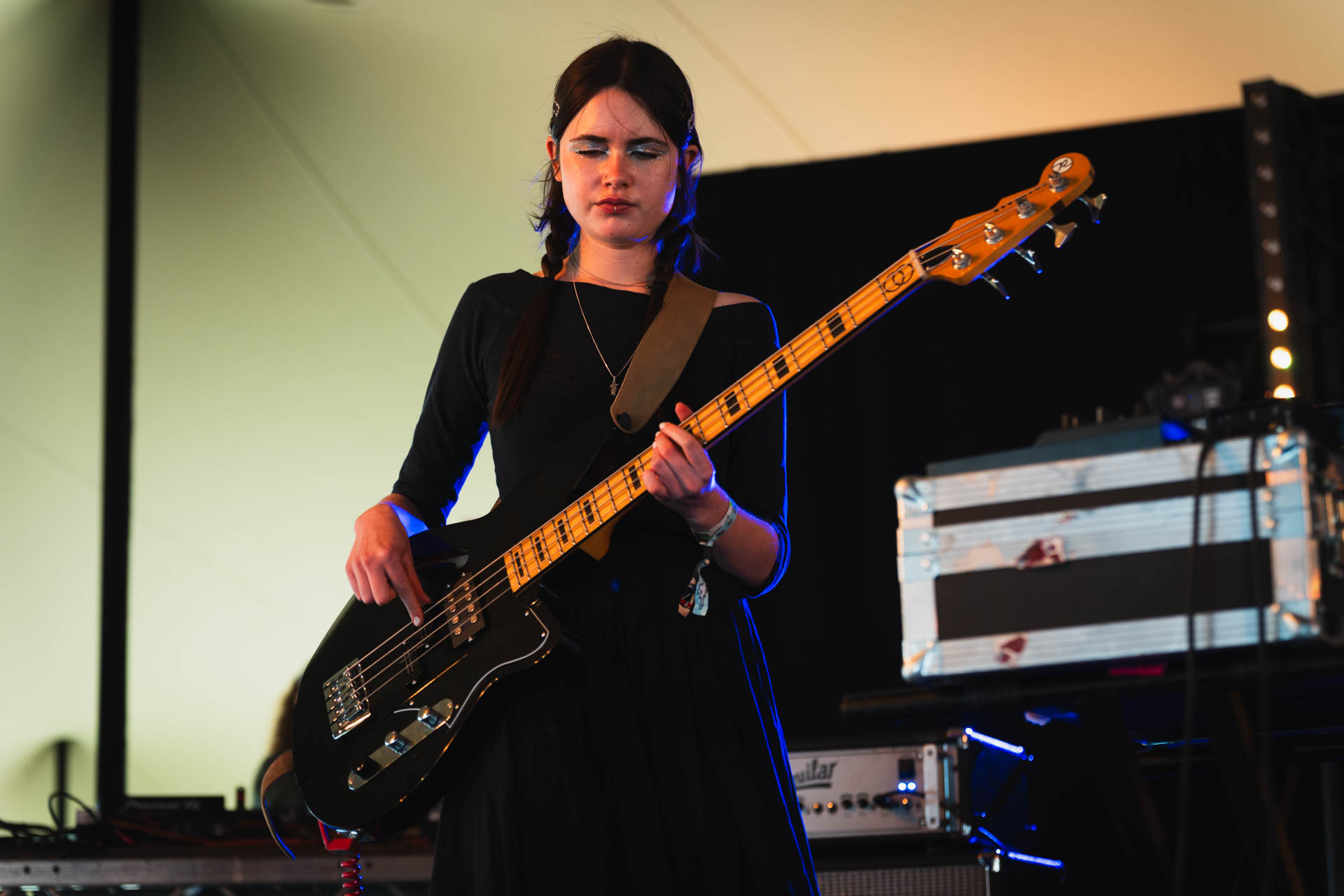
- Bassist Mikaela Oppenheimer

Background information
- Origin: New York City, U.S.
- Genre: Alternative rock
- Years active: 2019–present
- Label: Frenchkiss
- Members: Helena Straight; Stella Wave; Mikaela Oppenheimer

Hello Mary is an American alternative rock band from New York City. The band consists of college students Stella Wave, Helena Straight, and Mikaela Oppenheimer. Bands they have been influenced by and supported include Silversun Pickups, American Football and DIIV.

== History ==
The band formed in 2019 originally consisting of Helena Straight and Mikaela Oppenheimer, with Stella Wave joining shortly after, before their first public performance. In 2020, the band released their first EP titled Ginger.

In 2023, the group announced their self-titled debut album. The album was released on Frenchkiss Records on March 3, 2023. In 2024, the band released their latest song titled 0%. The bands second full-length album, Emita Ox, was released on September 13, 2024.

== Discography ==
Studio albums
Title	Details
Hello Mary	Released: March 3, 2023; Label: Frenchkiss; Formats: LP, CD, digital download, streaming
Emita Ox	Released: September 13, 2024; Label: Frenchkiss; Formats: LP, CD, digital download, streaming

EPs
Title	Details
Ginger	Released: February 14, 2020; Label: Self-released; Formats: digital download, streaming
Hello Mary on Audiotree Live	Released: April 9, 2025; Label: Audiotree; Formats: digital download, streaming

Singles
Title	Year	Album
"Apple"	2019	Ginger (EP)
"Take Something"	2021	Non-album single
"Evicted"	2021	Hello Mary
"Stinge" / "Sink In"	2022	Hello Mary
"Looking Right Into The Sun"	2022	Hello Mary
"Rabbit"	2022	Hello Mary
"Spiral"	2022	Hello Mary
"Special Treat"	2023	Hello Mary
"0%"	2024	Emita Ox
"Three"	2024	Emita Ox
"Down My Life"	2024	Emita Ox
