= List of Late Night with Seth Meyers episodes =

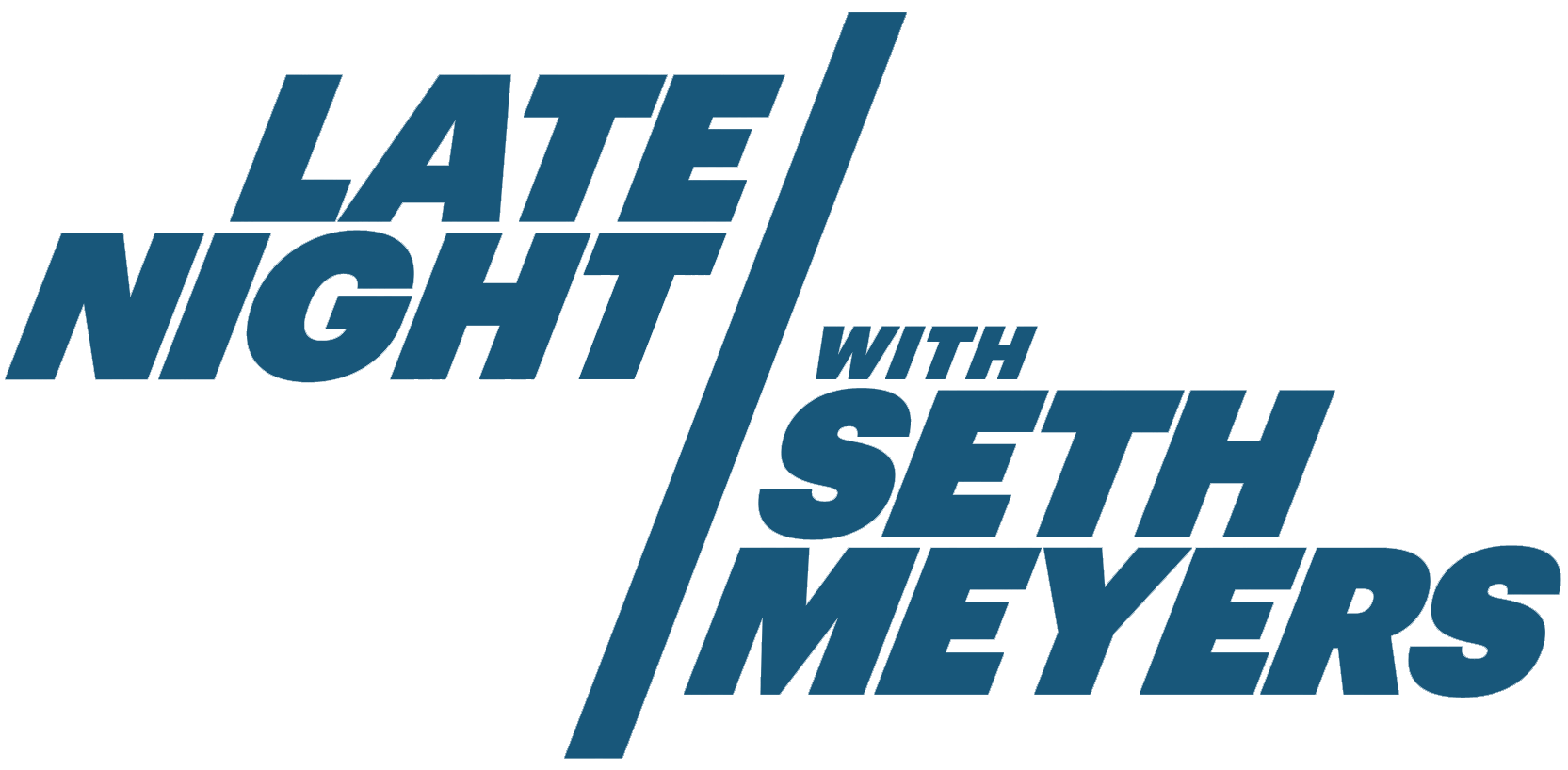

Late Night with Seth Meyers is an American late-night talk show hosted by Seth Meyers on NBC. A total of 1,834 episodes have aired.

== Episodes ==
=== October ===
No.	Original release date	Guest(s)	Musical/entertainment guest(s)
1834	October 1, 2026	Dakota Johnson, Mike Tomlin	N/A
A Closer Look
1835	October 5, 2026	Jessica Biel, Slayyyter	N/A
1836	October 6, 2026	Sebastian Stan, Jane Wickline, George Saunders	N/A
1837	October 7, 2026	Ben Affleck, David Byrne	N/A
1838	October 8, 2026	James McAvoy, José Andrés	N/A
