= 6/10 =

6/10 may refer to:

- June 10 (month-day date notation)
- October 6 (day-month date notation)
- The fraction 6/10
- "6/10", a 2017 song by Dodie Clark

== See also ==
- 3/5 (disambiguation)
