= The Untouchables (1993 TV series) =

- Genre: Crime drama
- Created by: Christopher Crowe
- Starring: Tom Amandes; William Forsythe; David James Elliott
- Composer: Joel Goldsmith
- Country of origin: United States
- Original language: English
- No. of seasons: 2
- No. of episodes: 42 (list of episodes)

Production
- Producers: Tim Iacofano; Frederick J. Lyle
- Camera setup: Single-camera
- Running time: 45–48 minutes
- Production companies: Christopher Crowe Productions; Paramount Domestic Television

Original release
- Network: Syndication
- Release: January 11, 1993 – May 22, 1994

The Untouchables is an American crime drama series that aired for two seasons in syndication, from January 1993 to May 1994. The series portrayed work of the real life Untouchables federal investigative squad in Prohibition-era Chicago and its efforts against Al Capone's attempts to profit from the market in bootleg liquor.

The series features Tom Amandes as Eliot Ness and William Forsythe as Al Capone, and was based on the 1959 series and 1987 film of the same name.

== Synopsis ==
Eliot Ness (Amandes), disgusted with the widespread criminality that Al Capone (Forsythe) has brought to his home town, Chicago, and inspired by the example of his brother-in-law, Alexander Jamie (Patrick Clear), a federal law enforcement officer, becomes a government investigator himself, and puts together a special squad specifically dedicated to putting Capone behind bars.

== Cast and characters ==
Actor	Character
Tom Amandes	Agent Eliot Ness
John Rhys-Davies	Agent Michael Malone
Paul Regina	Frank Nitti
David James Elliott	Agent Paul Robbins
Michael Horse	Agent George Steelman
John Haymes Newton	Agent Tony Pagano
Hynden Walch	Mae Capone
Nancy Everhard	Catherine Ness
Valentino Cimo	Frankie Rio
William Forsythe	Al Capone
Shea Farrell	Agent Sean Quinlan

== Episodes ==
Season	Episodes	Originally released	
Season	Episodes	First released	Last released
1	18	January 11, 1993	June 13, 1993
2	24	October 3, 1993	May 22, 1994

== DVD releases ==
Visual Entertainment has released the complete series on DVD in Region 1 on December 27, 2016.

The Untouchables was also released on Blu-ray in 2017.

== Soundtrack album ==
Dragon's Domain Records released a limited edition 2-CD set of Joel Goldsmith's work on the series in 2017, featuring the score from the two-hour pilot film and selections from the episodes "The Seduction of Eliot Ness," "A Man's Home Is His Castle," "Stir Crazy," "Railroaded," the two-parter "Cuba," "Attack on New York," "Mind Games," "The Legacy," "Stadt," "Til Death Do Us Part," and "Death and Taxes: Part 2."
