= Late Night with Seth Meyers =

American late-night talk show

- Also known as: Late Night (franchise brand)
- Genre: Late-night talk show; Variety show; News/Political satire
- Created by: David Letterman; Seth Meyers
- Developed by: Seth Meyers
- Directed by: Alex Vietmeier
- Presented by: Seth Meyers
- Announcer: Ron McClary
- Music by: Fred Armisen and the 8G Band (2014–2024)
- Opening theme: Late Night with Seth Meyers theme
- Composer: Fred Armisen
- Country of origin: United States
- Original language: English
- No. of seasons: 14
- No. of episodes: 1,858 (list of episodes)

Production
- Executive producers: Lorne Michaels; Seth Meyers; Mike Shoemaker
- Producers: Alex Baze; Eric Leiderman; Mike Shoemaker
- Production locations: Studio 8G, NBC Studios; New York, New York
- Camera setup: Multi-camera
- Running time: 41 minutes
- Production companies: Broadway Video; Universal Television; Sethmaker Shoemeyers Productions

Original release
- Network: NBC
- Release: February 24, 2014 – present

Related
- The Amber Ruffin Show

Late Night with Seth Meyers is an American late-night news and political satire variety talk show hosted by Seth Meyers on NBC. The show premiered on February 24, 2014, and is produced by Broadway Video and Universal Television. The program airs weeknights at 12:35/11:35c, it is the fourth iteration of NBC's Late Night franchise.

Until August 2024, the show featured bandleader Fred Armisen and the 8G Band as the show's house band. Late Night is produced by former Saturday Night Live producer Mike Shoemaker and executive-produced by Lorne Michaels. The show records in Studio 8G at 30 Rockefeller Plaza in New York City. Full episodes are available next day on Peacock. Clips of Late Night are provided on social media.

== History ==
The series is the fourth incarnation of the Late Night franchise, originated by David Letterman. Seth Meyers was appointed host when Jimmy Fallon was announced to become the next host of The Tonight Show (currently The Tonight Show Starring Jimmy Fallon), where he succeeded the previous host Jay Leno one week after that. Meyers's first guests were fellow SNL alum and Weekend Update co-anchor Amy Poehler, then-vice president of the United States Joe Biden, and musical act A Great Big World. The show's house band, The 8G Band, featured members of the indie bands Les Savy Fav and Girls Against Boys, and was typically led by SNL alum Fred Armisen.

On September 2, 2014, the show premiered a redesigned set.

On January 13, 2016, NBC renewed Meyers's contract to remain as host through 2021.

On March 13, 2020, the show suspended production due to the COVID-19 pandemic in the United States. Beginning on March 30, 2020, the show was produced from Meyers's residence or from his parents-in-laws' summer home. Meyers returned to a reworked studio on September 8, 2020, without a live audience. A live audience returned to the show on October 11, 2021.

Unlike other late-night talk show hosts, Meyers carried over the casual wardrobe worn during his remote episodes upon returning to the studio tapings in September 2020, often donning a sweater or a rolled-up shirt. He made an exception for two special occasions: the 40th-anniversary show of the Late Night franchise, with guest David Letterman (who hosted the original iteration of the show from 1982 until 1993) and for the 10th-anniversary episode of the show, with guests Amy Poehler and then-president Joe Biden (who were also guests on his first episode).

On February 26, 2021, NBC renewed Meyers's contract to remain as the host through 2025. In 2022, it was reported executives discussed moving the show to another time slot, reducing the number of people on its staff, or shifting it to Peacock or MSNBC. On May 13, 2024, NBC once again renewed Meyers's contract to remain as host through 2028, however due to a cut in the show's budget, the 8G Band were laid off. After one last on-air appearance on August 22, 2024, the band would continue to provide pre-recorded music for show openings, segment intros/outros, and guest entries.

== Production ==
Late Night with Seth Meyers originates from NBC Studio 8G in the Comcast Building at 30 Rockefeller Center in New York City. The studio is housed directly above Studio 6B, the home of The Tonight Show Starring Jimmy Fallon; the combination created logistical challenges for executives, who were concerned about "sound bleed" (as the Comcast Building was built with steel girders, sound is too easily conducted floor to floor). As a result, The Tonight Show tapes at 5:00pm, and Late Night would tape later in the evening, at 6:30pm. After returning to the studio following the COVID-19 pandemic Late Night pushed up their production schedule and now tapes at 4:00pm. The studio seats nearly 180 individuals, and is housed directly beside Studio 8H, longtime home of Saturday Night Live. Architectural Digest writes that the stage "strikes an Art Deco tone, with its illuminated proscenium arch reminiscent of the Chrysler Building's iconic crown." Until the end of the 2023–2024 season, Seth Meyers's Late Night had a house band, called The 8G Band, and led by Fred Armisen who also acted as the show's sidekick. He also performed as backing and co-lead vocals, rhythm guitars, bass and drums. The other personnel in the band were Seth Jabour on lead guitars and backing vocals, Marnie Stern on lead and rhythm guitars and backing vocals, Syd Butler on bass, and Eli Janney on keyboards, programmer and lead vocals. Just before Marnie Stern took over for Fred Armisen as guitarist in 2015, the role of drummer was held by Kimberly Thompson, who performed trumpets, backing vocals and melodicas since the premiere of Late Night on February 24, 2014. Guest performers, such as drummers The Pocket Queen and Larnell Lewis, were used for weeks when Armisen had other commitments, and their residencies were promoted in each episode's logline on an equal level with the stage guests.

=== Production process ===
- 8:30am The staff work on the episode's first act, which usually focuses on politics or other current events. A first draft is written by one of the writers, such as Sal Gentile, and Meyers goes over it to add to it or modify it.
- 11:00am The staff has a sketch meeting in which it plans non-political and longer lead-in segments, such as the popular recurring sketches "Extreme Dog Shaming" or "Ya Burnt". The staff use this opportunity to make relevant notes on the sketches.
- 12:00pm Meyers and producer Mike Shoemaker meet with the show's department heads for a production meeting in which graphics, costuming and pre-taping schedules for the episode's segments are discussed.
- 2:00pm – 4:00pm After Meyers reads an estimated 100 to 130 jokes with Shoemaker and a smaller group of monologue writers, he retreats to his office to hone the opening monologue and research the night's guests.
- 4:00pm The staff goes to the Late Night studio for a test run with an audience of people that the production assistants round up outside 30 Rockefeller Center. This test run gives Meyers the opportunity to discern which jokes are working.
- 4:30pm Any changes made in the early meeting are tested with the audience respondents, with fine-tune transitions made on-set by the writers.
- 5:00pm After the rehearsal, Meyers prepares for the real taping, which includes changing into his familiar attire and going over the cue cards.
- 5:45pm In his dressing room, Meyers re-reads his guests' biographies in order to find topics of conversation that they have not been asked about repeatedly. He has said, "If you ask them a question where they see you've done your homework, then they open up more."
- 6:00pm Meyers discusses any last-minute additions with the writers based on the day's events. Typically at least three or four notable news events occur between the first round of jokes to the taping, according to Meyers.
- 6:15pm As the band warms up, Meyers greets the episode's guests in the dressing rooms, while avoiding any pre-taping conversation that would rob the on-set interview of energy.
- 6:25pm Before the taping begins, Meyers goes out to the audience to greet them, asking individual members about themselves and sharing knowledge of the history of Studio 8G.
- 6:30pm Taping begins.

The show typically tapes four new episodes a week, Monday through Thursday, from 6:30PM to 8PM.

=== Show structure and segments ===
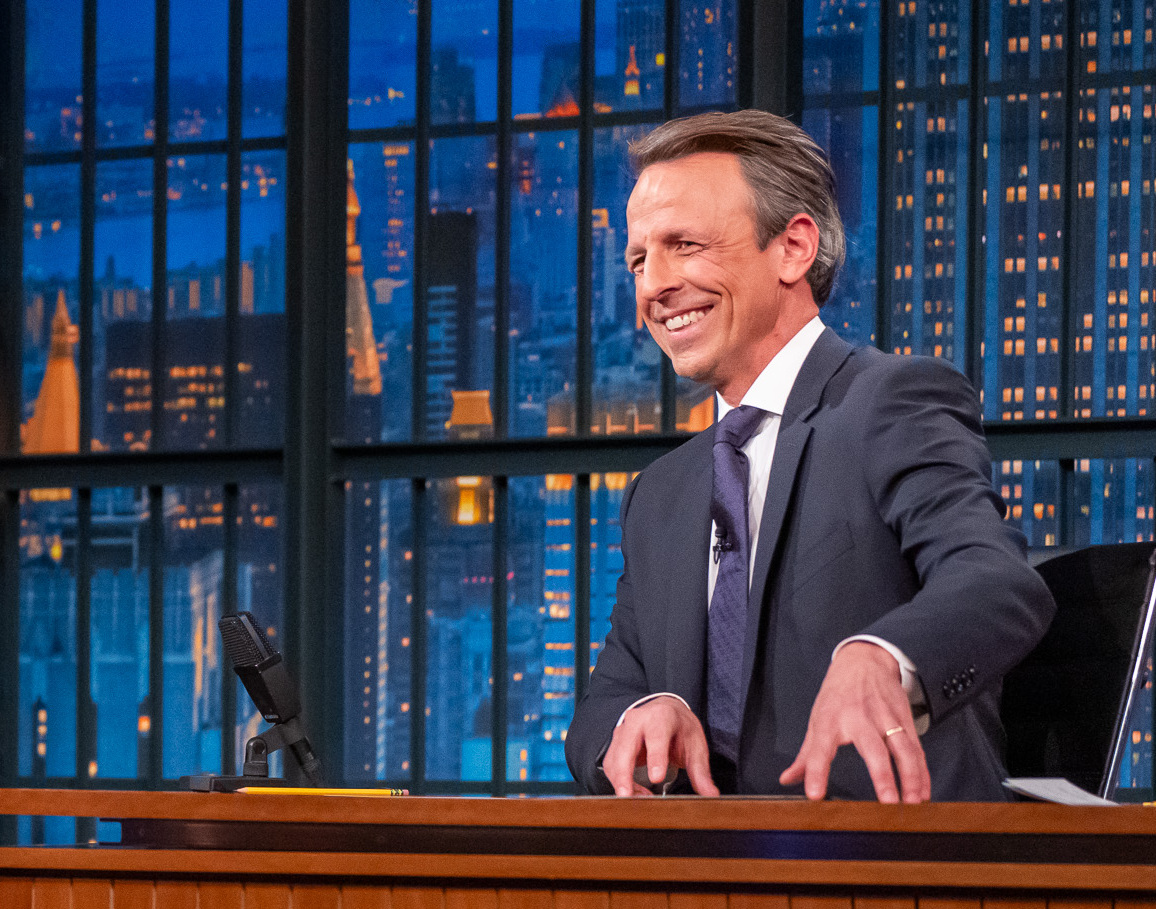
Meyers on the set of Late Night in 2024

The show opens with Ron McClary proclaiming "From 30 Rockefeller Plaza in New York, it's Late Night with Seth Meyers!" and announcing that night's guests and The 8G Band with Fred Armisen, and/or guest musicians. McClary introduces Meyers with "Ladies and gentlemen, Seth Meyers." Previously, the introduction to Meyers was "And now here he is, Seth Meyers!". Meyers performs a monologue from his desk based around recent news, punctuating jokes with on-screen images and video. For the first year and a half of the program, Meyers performed a traditional stand-up monologue, before changing to a seated, Weekend Update-style opening monologue. This segment is normally followed by a long-form desk piece, or an interaction with bandleader Fred Armisen. The desk piece then leads to a commercial break. After the first commercial, one of various recurring segments appears, followed by the first of the episode's guests, which usually include celebrities and actors, literary figures, people in fashion, artists, athletes, and politicians. The first guest may return after the second commercial break, or be followed by the second guest. The third commercial break is normally followed by either a musical guest or a segment featuring that night's regular guests. Alternatively, a third guest may be featured.

On some occasions, Meyers does not follow this pattern at all; rather, he will perform a monologue followed by a long series of interviews without other segments. This first occurred following the series finale of Parks and Recreation, an NBC sitcom starring Meyers's former co-anchor and close friend Amy Poehler. This occurred again with the cast of the then-upcoming film Sisters (which starred Poehler), although the episode featured a short desk segment between the monologue and interviews. An annual holiday tradition since the show's debut year has been an episode broadcast on Thanksgiving night in which the only guests are Meyers's parents, Hilary and Larry, and his younger brother Josh.

The show eventually increased its focus on politics. After Jon Stewart left The Daily Show in 2015, Meyers's program has gradually moved towards the "longer-form political comedy" style The Daily Show is known for. In an interview with journalist Chris Hayes, Meyers acknowledged this change, saying that the show was always intended to be politically minded, but when the show started, the creators opted to only gradually work the political material into the content to measure the amount of workload following the 24-hour news cycle would cause. The program has been described as "The Daily Show for people without basic cable."

=== Recurring segments ===
- A Closer Look: In a desk piece that normally follows, and is closely entwined with, the monologue, Meyers explains and satirizes a difficult or misunderstood political issue. One of Meyers's original visions for the show, "A Closer Look" has become the signature segment of Late Night. However, when it premiered, the crew could not sustain the long-form writing and intense research periods required to develop the segments. The segment typically appears on every episode except for those broadcast on Tuesday nights. Each segment features a broad topic which Meyers explains and jokes about, with frequent use of news clippings and video from network news. Typically about 10 minutes long, "A Closer Look" has ranged in length from three minutes to almost sixteen minutes, depending on the topic; one edition in particular, airing the night after Election Day 2020, lasted a full twenty-one minutes. For the show airing on October 2, 2023, the first following the end of the five-month 2023 Writers Guild of America strike, the segment was extended to cover everything from the duration of the show's hiatus and temporarily renamed "A Closer Look To the Max", taking up nearly the entire episode except for the final eight minutes.
- A Couple Things: Meyers gives a few quick comments in response to, and pointing out the inaccuracies or hypocrisies of, a news story.
- Actathalon: One of the night's guests, normally an established or applauded actor, participates in a series of challenges based on stereotypical movie tropes. Challenges in the ten event series include "looking in the mirror and wondering who you've become", "quitting a job angrily", "hanging up the phone then swiping everything off a desk", and "doing an interview for a movie that you know is horrible".
- Amber Says What?: Staff writer Amber Ruffin discusses the news, ending each comment with "I was like, what," with various emphases (anger, confusion, shock, etc.) on the word "what."
- Amber's Minute of Fury: As opposed to the multiple-topic format of "Amber Says What?", here staff writer Amber Ruffin focuses her ire on a singular topic, news event, or newsmaker.
- At This Point in the Broadcast: Meyers shares an unpopular opinion while a "network apology" scrolls on the screen and is read by show announcer and staff writer Ben Warheit. The disclaimer states due to technical reasons, the segment could not be excised from the broadcast. While it's being read, Meyers is seen pantomiming a profane rant (no audio is heard from Meyers, outside of audience reaction) against mundane topics such as trees, exercising at the gym, or Netflix. This sketch is a parody of a message aired during reruns of a 1994 Saturday Night Live episode hosted by Martin Lawrence; his monologue in that episode, which included a rant about female hygiene, got him banned from the show and almost got the cast members at the time fired.
- Bad Sponsors: Meyers promotes the fake, horrible sponsors who supposedly give money to the show.
- Back in My Day: Seth dons a Mister Rogers-style old sweater, sits in an old chair, and reminisces about how things were simpler and better in "the good old days"... even though those days were only weeks or months ago.
- The Check In: Seth discusses a political topic, particularly one relating to the Trump administration, that has not received much attention because it is not timely or spans multiple, smaller news stories. Examples include the Trump administration's relationship with religion or their response to the opioid crisis in America. This segment usually airs once a week on Tuesday nights in place of "A Closer Look", although there are weeks where it does not appear.
- Clear the Air: Seth and a guest (most often a former Saturday Night Live cohort) sit down one-on-one and take turns seeking forgiveness for the bad things they've said or done to each other (e.g. Seth admitting to Rachel Dratch he bailed out on attending her birthday party, and Rachel admitting she had Seth arrested at the airport).
- CORRECTIONS: Seth reads through comments the show receives on YouTube, and in this digital-only featurette responds to the commenters he "sort of lovingly" calls jackals, or corrects mistakes he made on-air during that week or previous weeks. A popular online segment (and filmed without a studio audience present), "CORRECTIONS" has been a four-time Emmy Award nominee for Outstanding Short Form Comedy, Drama or Variety Series (it lost out to Carpool Karaoke: The Series in both 2021 and 2022, and lost again in 2024 and 2025).
- Day Drinking: Meyers takes a guest for drinks while asking questions and playing drinking games connected to the guest's work. Guests on the segment have included Rihanna, Lizzo, the Jonas Brothers, Dua Lipa, Kelly Clarkson, Lorde, Kristen Stewart, Kevin Hart, Paul Rudd, Sabrina Carpenter and Will Forte, among others. Meyers has also taken members of his family, including his mother and brother Josh Meyers, for drinks in the morning.
- Deep Google: Meyers reads progressively deeper into the last pages of a Google search with "millions of results".
- Extreme Dog Shaming: A parody of the internet trend of adorable dogs posing next to signs indicating they had done something bad; here, for example, a beagle would admit "I corrected someone's grammar during a eulogy." The list normally ends with the Meyers family's own dog, Frisbee, shaming Seth (e.g. "I go to bed after Fallon").
- Fake or Florida: a game show parody where contestants have to guess whether or not a bizarre crime or incident set in Florida was real. Any contestant from Florida proper is blindfolded in order to level the playing field. Score is kept with manatee cutouts on dowels stuck into a holder.
- Fred Talks (aka Fred Checks In): Whenever Fred Armisen sat in with The 8G Band and a fellow Saturday Night Live alumnus was a guest, said guest would tend to make Fred the butt of a joke, pretending not to remember him during their time at SNL or expressing a negative relationship with him. More often than that, though, Seth would allow Fred to exercise his improvisation skills. Running about two minutes in length, this segment involved Seth asking a question Fred would not know beforehand (because Seth often thought it up on the walk from the dressing room to the studio). The question was usually worded as a simple inquiry about Fred's latest project, activity, or business venture (a TV show, new store, charity work, etc.). After confirming Seth's "inquiry," Fred would expand on the subject via ad lib, offering elaborate twists and sometimes making the "service" something no one would need. The bit would have variations over the years, including:
  - Fred Armisen: Art Aficionado: Fred provides a backstory to a painting Seth shows him on the spot.
  - Fred Armisen's Extremely Accurate TV Recaps: Seth attempts to prove that Fred is lying when he claims to watch every single episode of every TV show by reading him the title of a TV show and asking him to explain what it's about. Fred then makes up a lengthy and obviously incorrect description of the show. When he finishes, Seth explains what the show is actually about, upon which Fred will claim that his description was more accurate or that the description Seth read was a minor detail of the show that Fred simply left out.
  - Fred Judges a Book By Its Cover: Similar to the above "TV Recaps", only here Fred claims that, despite his busy schedule, he's built an appreciation of literary fiction by just looking at a book's front cover. Seth then puts Fred to the test by showing the cover of an actual book. Though Fred's plot description is way off the mark, he still manages to connect it to the actual plot. (e.g. saying David Weber's science-fiction tome Uncompromising Honor is about an illegal car detailing operation).
  - FredEx: If Fred was away from Late Night due to other commitments, and "to keep him involved in the show when he's not here," Seth would mail him a FedEx package containing costumes, wigs, or props that served as prompts for Fred to create a character and situation on the spot.
- Game of Jones: Seth and former Saturday Night Live regular Leslie Jones are huge fans of the TV series Game of Thrones, with the latter known for live-tweeting the show as it aired on HBO. On a few occasions during the show's run, Seth and Leslie sat down together to watch and comment on a GOT episode they had not seen in advance. Noted editions of the filmed segments include the bookend episodes of the series' 8th and final season, as well as a 2017 segment in which Conleth Hill, in full-on costume as Varys, surprises Leslie and joins in on the conversation.
- Hey! Seth gets the attention of newsmakers and other figures in current events to deliver them strong words (e.g. Donald Trump, for falsely claiming voter fraud).
- Jeff Wright conversations: In filmed segments, staff writer Jeff Wright appears as multiple figures or subjects in current events conversing with each other (e.g. the jurors who convicted Derek Chauvin, various COVID-19 vaccines awaiting a "job interview").
- Joke Bucket: Rather than write the setups and then the punchlines for Seth's monologue jokes, his staff tends to write the punchlines ahead of time. Seeking to make lemonade from lemons, Seth pulls punchlines written on slips of paper from an aluminum "joke bucket" until they suitably match a joke setup from the news. A successful match causes Seth to staple the joke and punchline together, stamp it with his approval, ring a "joke bell", and put the match into a "completed joke bucket". Going through mismatches leads to the bucket emptying out before the last joke is matched, causing Seth to seek a match from the likes of a "joke volcano" or a "used joke lot".
- Jokes Seth Can't Tell: When prefacing this segment, Seth notes the diverse makeup of the show's writing team, which sometimes writes jokes that he (being a straight, white male) could not deliver without facing criticism. Rather than have those jokes go untold, two of those writers, Amber Ruffin (a Black woman) and Jenny Hagel (a Puerto Rican lesbian), step in alongside Seth and alternate delivering the jokes' punchlines after Seth reads the setups. The segment ends with Amber and Jenny coaxing Seth into telling a full joke; when he delivers the punchline, however, it's met with immediate shock by a chastising Amber and Jenny. Seth's defensive response, after the ladies said it'd be okay to tell the punchline ("Black women and lesbians are liars!"), was improvised, according to Hagel, by Seth during the segment's first rehearsal; it was left in during that night's taping and has closed the segment ever since. "Jokes Seth Can't Tell" has had some variations over the years, including having a third woman join the desk (e.g. Hillary Clinton in 2017, Wanda Sykes in 2022), and for the segment's 50th performance in November 2023, Amber and Jenny surprising Seth by forcing him to read the punchlines after they read the setups.
- The Kind of Story We Need Right Now: Giving his audience a respite from bleak current events, here Seth highlights unique, uplifting, and amusing news items. Such examples include a woman who played music by Metallica to scare away a threatening bobcat, and a man who successfully challenged a ticket for using his phone while driving (he was eating a McDonald's hash brown instead).
- The Late Night Debate/Press Conference: During presidential debate season, Seth is seated as a "moderator" and riffs comedic "questions" with actual footage of the participants within those debates taken out of context. Outside of that setting, Seth does the same, but with White House press briefings and other news conferences.
- The Leave Him Alone Guy: When Seth starts a segment of jokes about a certain newsmaker, a man in the audience (staff writer John Lutz) stands up and, sensing that the jokes Seth is about to tell will be mean-spirited in tone, loudly asks him to "leave him alone!" and instead make jokes about his own peculiarities and shortcomings ("If you have to make fun of somebody, make fun of me!").
- One of My Writers Explains a Joke: Not every joke in Seth's monologue receives a warm response from the audience. For the jokes that really miss the mark (normally ones with bad puns for a punchline), Seth, feigning disappointment, calls on the carpet the staff writer who wrote the joke to explain it to the audience.
- Point, Counterpoint: Staff writers Ally Hord and Amber Ruffin debate over topics in the news, but while Ally is serious and on-point, Amber goes lightheartedly off-topic with a term Ally had just used. For example, when discussing the Trump administration's attempts to bar transgender people from serving in the U.S. military, Ally calls it a "stunt" to distract from Donald Trump's personal scandals, to which Amber counterpoints with thoughts on how she loves cinematic action stunts. Ally often voices disappointment by Amber's straying, which is quickly defended by Seth ("You make a point, she makes a counterpoint, and that's how it works").
- Popsicle Schtick: A lengthy and rarely-seen segment mainly used only on shows with few guests or when Meyers is performing ill, the show's writers and graphics departments come together to wrap around purposefully poorly-written jokes usually emblematic of the type seen on Popsicle sticks, with long and elaborate interludes performed by CGI popsicle sticks in costume, which have included parodies of Jesus Christ Superstar and Les Misérables. In one of his annual Thanksgiving night appearances, Seth's father Larry stated "Popsicle Schtick" was his least favorite segment on the show.
- Really?! When Amy Poehler pays a visit, she and Seth reprise their Weekend Update segment in which the two would lambast a current topic by angrily and varyingly exclaiming "really".
- The Scollywood Minute: Staff writer Mike Scollins discusses upcoming theatrical movie releases, award ceremonies, and other showbiz news, only to turn each mini-review into a comedic jab at Seth.
- Second Chance Theatre: Meyers gives a fellow former Saturday Night Live cast member a chance to stage a sketch they wrote that never made it to air at SNL. Will Forte, Jason Sudeikis, Andy Samberg, and Will Ferrell have participated so far.
- Sea Captain During the COVID pandemic, Seth's sidekick was a portrait of a sea captain, voiced by Will Forte.
- Seth Explains Teen Slang: Meyers takes current pop culture topics and changes them into words that he claims teenagers are using to describe things, followed by an example sentence.
- Surprise Inspection! The military-themed title card isn't the only thing Seth shakes his head over in this segment that features actual jokes written by the show's staff that didn't reach monologue-level quality. Seth warns the audience that some of the jokes (which are followed by the responsible writer being identified) are dumb, baffling, or even patently offensive, but notes that "because a lot of [the writers] don't watch this show, they'll never know we're doing this."
- This Week in Numbers: Seth uses data, both real and fictional, to set up jokes on pop culture and the news.
- Tiny Secret Whispers: While Late Night taped without a studio audience during the COVID-19 pandemic, Seth would recommend to his studio crew, and his viewers, this (fictitious) murder mystery series he's hooked on, discussing its various actors, storylines, and intriguing plot twists, as well as "Butternut," the "show's" streaming video home that specializes in American shows featuring all-foreign casts playing Americans.
- Venn Diagrams: Meyers looks at two different categories, using the spot where they overlap to tell a joke about pop culture and the news.
- What Does Karen Know? Seth shows millennial-aged staff writer Karen Chee images she has not previously seen, primarily items and celebrities popular during her infancy or before her birth. The items are those that Generation X can immediately recognize, so the comedy comes in Karen guessing what they may be, such as a PalmPilot ("an ancient iPad?") or a Teddy Ruxpin doll ("It's an off-brand teddy bear?"), as well as Seth humorously trying to explain them to her. Karen returns the favor and shows Seth items that she grew up on but he and his older generation may not recognize.
- The Wrong Take: Seth offers this compendium of the worst "hot take" opinions from "average citizen" interviews about issues that matter most to Americans.
- Ya Burnt: A story about a study of "migrating Amazonian tree frogs" is interrupted by the smell of smoke in the studio... which means it's time for a roast: A range of subjects is displayed on the screen (a la Pardon the Interruption), with Seth offering biting critiques and saying "ya burnt!" to each before moving to the next topic. Occasionally, an "unburnable" topic appears, one which Seth praises (and removes from the screen) rather than roasts. The "tree frogs" introduction is a running gag that dates from the Tina Fey/Jimmy Fallon era on Saturday Night Live's Weekend Update, which invariably led to an interruption from a guest commentator; Meyers would continue the bit during his Update run, and admitted he "stole" it when he moved to Late Night. "Ya Burnt" almost always ends with time running out right as Seth would have begun roasting a person or thing whose mocking would be considered in poor taste (e.g. soup kitchen volunteers in a Thanksgiving-themed segment).

=== Live episodes ===
In July 2016, it was announced that the show would produce two live episodes following the final nights of the Republican and Democratic National Conventions. The show is normally recorded live on tape (primarily), but too early in the day to feature content from each night's convention. As a result, Meyers opted to host the show live to have the first opportunity for a fresh take on how each convention ended.

The first live episode featured guests Leslie Jones and Carlo Mirarchi, as well as a live "Ya Burnt" segment. One of the roasting topics for the segment was "live television", in which Meyers stated that he was going to test the Standards & Practices division at NBC to see how well they could censor him live if he used swear words. Ultimately, a few swears were aired in the live version. Meyers also joked with Jones in her interview that she cannot swear like she normally does, because the show would be live. Despite this, Jones ultimately did swear in her interview, though the network censor caught it.

The second live episode featured guests Colin Jost, Michael Che, and Jessi Klein. The episode also featured a live "Jokes Seth Can't Tell" segment, in which writer Amber Ruffin used the phrase "bigger dicks though" as the punchline of a joke. Meyers appeared caught off-guard and chastised her for the use of the word, to which she responded by reminding him that the show is live so the network cannot stop them from saying it. Meyers repeated the line offhand later in the segment.

The third live episode followed the first presidential debate of the 2016 general election. Will Forte, Mandy Moore, and David Ortiz were the guests, with a special appearance by Weekend Update co-anchor Colin Jost. The show opened with a brief monologue, followed by an extended "A Closer Look" segment about the night's debate. It was the first live episode to go as planned, with no impromptu mishaps or swears.

The fourth live episode followed the 2018 midterm elections. Chris Hayes was originally announced to be the guest, but was replaced by Billy Eichner and Soledad O'Brien in the live version. The episode also featured an extended "A Closer Look" segment about the results of the elections and a live "Amber Says What" segment with writer Amber Ruffin.

The fifth live episode followed the 2019 State of the Union Address. The episode featured guests Taylor Schilling and Ana Navarro, with an extended "A Closer Look" segment about the Address and a live "Jokes Seth Can't Tell" segment.

== Reception ==
=== Ratings ===
Season	Nielsen rank	Nielsen rating	Tied with
2013–14	4	1.9	N/A
2014–15	4	1.5	N/A
2015–16	N/A	.71	N/A
2016–17	N/A	0.26	N/A
2017–18	TBD	0.23	TBD
2020–21	TBD	0.2	TBD

Late Night with Seth Meyers premiered to high ratings. It debuted to 3.4 million viewers and a 1.4 rating among the key demographic of adults aged 18–49—the best ratings for the Late Night franchise since January 2005. Several months into its run, the show averaged 1.5 million viewers nightly, which was slightly down from Fallon's final average as host. It remained at the same average one year later, in July 2015.

=== Critical reception ===
The show initially received mixed reviews. The Hollywood Reporter's Tim Goodman referred to Meyers's monologue as "staccato and hit and miss—sounding more like his 'Weekend Update' bits rather than a real monologue." On the other hand, USA Today's Robert Bianco felt Meyers was "shifting the show to suit his talents," making the show stronger and more traditional than Fallon's. Reviewing the debut week, The A.V. Club gave a B grade: The show begins with, "essentially, a carbon copy of Meyers's Weekend Update / 'what's in the news' jokes [...] Meyers will settle in to the formulaic parts of this job quickly enough—he's a pro, and it shows... " A month later, Jeff Jensen of Entertainment Weekly gave the program a B+ and wrote, "In his first week, the very smart, very smiley former Saturday Night Live head writer gave stiff monologue, which was basically his Weekend Update newsreader shtick, delivered in his shouty, wiseassy, talk-to-the-camera manner, but standing up; he improved the more he connected with the studio audience. He rolls when sitting down. Meyers seems capable of creating chemistry and having quality chats with anyone, from riding the wild waves of Kanye West to spinning a funny anecdote with pal Brad Paisley about accidentally stealing a Porsche."

Reviews have grown more positive as the show has evolved. In 2015, David Sims of The Atlantic wrote that the program "quietly [became] a heavy hitter, mixing a solid monologue with great scripted and semi-improvised bits from its writers." The Wall Street Journal's Sophia Hollander, with regard to the show's emphasis on authors, considered it "something of an intellectual salon, with authors and biting political commentary as well as celebrities." Bruce Fretts of New York felt the show distinguished itself from its contemporaries with a heavier focus on politics.

The 2016 election cycle allowed the show to further increase its focus on politics, satirizing the daily news both in the monologue and longform "A Closer Look" segments. At the behest of NBC executives, Late Night does not attempt to "equally cover" the news. Rather, jokes and segments are written openly from Meyers's more liberal viewpoint. This is also, in part, to help distinguish the show from its lead-in, The Tonight Show Starring Jimmy Fallon, which attempts to skewer from an unbiased perspective. Meyers's transition from broad appeal comedy to his personal views has been critically praised by some outlets, saying that the show has been able to find its own footing more in these political pieces. Conversely, Jonny Coleman of LA Weekly called Meyers a "purveyor of toxic fluff" who has "demonstrated zero political efficacy." Dave Itzkoff of The New York Times praised "A Closer Look" and Meyers for embracing a more political style, noting "This approach has helped 'Late Night', which was drawing more than 1.6 million viewers at the end of last year, stand out in a crowded field of competitors, and has earned Mr. Meyers praise from viewers, critics and his fellow hosts."

The show has received five Primetime Emmy Award nominations for writing, and two for directing. In 2022, Late Night with Seth Meyers received its first Outstanding Variety Talk Series nomination. The show earned its second nomination for Outstanding Talk Series in 2023.

== Broadcast ==
In MENA countries, the show airs on OSN First Comedy HD, and re-airs two hours after the presentation on OSN First Comedy +2.

The show started airing across Europe on CNBC Europe from November 1, 2016, at 23:00 GMT (00:00 CET), as a replacement for The Tonight Show Starring Jimmy Fallon which used to occupy the same slot, however from November 2016 the Tonight Show has exclusive broadcast rights across Europe on the E! channel so Late Night was chosen as its replacement.

The show airs on CNBC Europe Mondays to Fridays at 22:30 GMT/BST (23:30 CET). Episodes now air in an uncut one hour format, airing episodes on a one-day delay from US transmission. On Saturdays and Sundays, episodes of the show air in an uncut one hour format from 20:00 GMT/BST (21:00 CET) with three episodes airing on a Saturday and three episodes airing on a Sunday. The weekend episodes are from editions which had aired around a week before across the USA.

In Hong Kong and Southeast Asia, the show airs on Rock Entertainment from weeknights at 23:30 HKT (22:30 for THA/WIB), 12 hours after its American telecast (with the Friday episode airing on Monday).
