= Future Generations (band) =

Electro indie-pop band formed in 2011

- Origin: New York, NY
- Genres: Indie pop; Electro pop
- Years active: 2011–present
- Label: Frenchkiss Records
- Members: Eddie Gore; Devon Sheridan; Mike Sansevere; Eric Grossman; Dylan Wells

Future Generations is an electro indie-pop band based in Brooklyn, New York, United States.

== Biography ==
Future Generations was formed by Eddie Gore, Eric Grossman, and Mike Sansevere, who met the first week of their freshman year at Fordham University in the Bronx, New York, United States in 2011, when they ran into each other by chance in their dorm building's shared practice room. Gore met Devon Sheridan in line to buy tickets for a school dance their junior year and asked him to play bass in the band. They recruited Dylan Wells from a Craigslist ad in 2016. Currently, all five members live together in a four-bedroom apartment in the Prospect Lefferts Gardens neighborhood of Brooklyn, NY.

Gore is the main songwriter and lyricist but all five members of the band contribute sounds, rhythms, and arrangements. The quintet started out calling themselves "The Suits", but after they were contacted by another band with that name, they changed their name to Future Generations.

Gore posted some of the band's songs online where they were discovered by the label, Frenchkiss Records. Frenchkiss put out their Polysun EP in 2014. The eponymous debut album was released July 2016. Atwood Magazine called the album "universally appealing" and said, of the single "Stars," "its catchy tune and fast-pace mask its hidden depth." PopMatters said the single "Coast" "recalls the flawlessly nonchalant rock of Two Door Cinema Club and Future Generations’ Frenchkiss labelmates Passion Pit."

With producer Justin Gerrish (Vampire Weekend, Hamilton Leithauser), they recorded 11 songs in 11 days for their second album, Landscape, which focuses on themes of love, loss, and perseverance. The album was received positively by critics, with Blackbook taking note of the band's “lush synths, sumptuous harmonies and infectious hooks,” Ones To Watch saying they "display a wealth of hooky melodies, which is immediately accessible for the listener at hand," and Atwood Magazine calling Landscape "A proper, fully realized album... immersively warm, charmingly upbeat, thoughtfully engaging and sonically distinctive." PopMatters called their single "Out Loud" "a hooky, carefree, sophisticated slice of synthpop."

== Discography ==
- Polysun EP (2014)
- Future Generations (2016)
- Landscape (2018)
