= Backlash Cop =

Studio album by Jetplane Landing
- Released: 18 June 2007
- Genre: Funk rock; punk rock
- Length: 36:36
- Label: Smalltown America
- Producer: Andrew Ferris

Jetplane Landing chronology
Once Like a Spark (2003)	Backlash Cop (2007)

Backlash Cop is the third studio album by the Northern Irish band Jetplane Landing, released on 18 June 2007.

== Reception ==
Professional ratings
Review scores
Source	Rating
Drowned in Sound	9/10
The Line of Best Fit	70%

Ben Marwood of Drowned in Sound awarded it 9 out of 10, calling it Jetplane Landing's most consistent work to date. Rich Hughes of The Line of Best Fit gave it a 70% rating, highlighting its mix of compelling and challenging material.

== Track listing ==
All tracks are written by Jetplane Landing.

Backlash Cop track listing
No.	Title	Length
1.	"Backlash Cop"	2:52
2.	"White Music"	3:23
3.	"Dizzy Gillespie for President"	5:38
4.	"Lungs of Punk"	3:12
5.	"Why Do They Never Play Les Savy Fav on the Radio?"	2:36
6.	"The Breaks (Part 1)"	2:00
7.	"The Breaks (Part 2)"	1:29
8.	"Jamerson Used the Claw"	1:48
9.	"Sam Cooke"	2:31
10.	"Climbing up the Face of Miles Davis"	2:33
11.	"Us and the Ringside Stars"	1:37
12.	"Hendrix Sur La Lune"	2:48
13.	"Reprise"	1:06
14.	"Song for Sonia Sanchez"	3:05

== Personnel ==
Credits are adapted from the album's liner notes.

- Andrew Ferris - vocals, guitar
- Raife Burchell - drums
- Cahir O'Doherty - lead guitar
- Jamie Burchell - bass guitar
- Harvey Birrell - engineering, recording, mixing, mastering
- Matt Littler - sleeve art
- Andy Rouse - sleeve design, layout
