= List of The Untouchables (1993 TV series) episodes =

This is a list of episodes for the 1993–94 television series The Untouchables, starring Tom Amandes as Eliot Ness.

== Series overview ==
| Season | Episodes | Originally released | |
| Season | Episodes | First released | Last released |
|---|---|---|---|
| 1 | 18 | January 11, 1993 | June 13, 1993 |
| 2 | 24 | October 3, 1993 | May 22, 1994 |

== Episodes ==
=== Season 1: 1993 ===
| No. overall | No. in season | Title | Directed by | Written by | Original release date |
|---|---|---|---|---|---|
| 1 | 1 | "Pilot" | Eric Laneuville | Christopher Crowe | January 11, 1993 |
| 2 | 2 | "Pilot" | Eric Laneuville | Christopher Crowe | January 11, 1993 |
| 3 | 3 | "First Blood" | Aaron Lipstadt | Jacob Epstein & Ken Solarz | January 17, 1993 |
| 4 | 4 | "Murder Ink: Part 1" | James Quinn | David Israel | January 24, 1993 |
| 5 | 5 | "Murder Ink: Part 2" | Cliff Bole | David Israel | January 31, 1993 |
| 6 | 6 | "Deal with the Devil" | James Quinn | Jack Thibeau | February 7, 1993 |
| 7 | 7 | "A Tale of Two Fathers: Part 1" | Steve De Jarnatt | Andrew Mirisch & Richard Chapman | February 14, 1993 |
| 8 | 8 | "A Tale of Two Fathers: Part 2" | Steve De Jarnatt | Andrew Mirisch | February 21, 1993 |
| 9 | 9 | "The Seduction of Eliot Ness" | Colin Bucksey | John Schulian | March 14, 1993 |
| 10 | 10 | "Chinatown" | John Nicolella | Story by : Jack Thibeau; Teleplay by : Steve Bello & Jack Thibeau | March 21, 1993 |
| 11 | 11 | "Pretty Boy Tommy Irish" | John Nicolella | Jack Thibeau | April 11, 1993 |
| 12 | 12 | "Pagano's Folly" | Colin Bucksey | LeMar Fooks | April 25, 1993 |
| 13 | 13 | "Framed" | Charles Robert Carner | Charles Robert Carner | May 2, 1993 |
| 14 | 14 | "Betrayal in Black and Tan" | John McPherson | Michael Lazarou | May 9, 1993 |
| 15 | 15 | "One Way Street" | Mario Di Leo | Kenneth A. Rudman | May 16, 1993 |
| 16 | 16 | "A Man's Home Is His Castle" | John Nicolella | Jack Thibeau | May 23, 1993 |
| 17 | 17 | "Halstead Holler" | Vern Gillum | Jack Thibeau & Loyal Truesdale | June 6, 1993 |
| 18 | 18 | "Atlantic City" | John McPherson | Steve Bello | June 13, 1993 |

=== Season 2: 1993–94 ===
| No. overall | No. in season | Title | Directed by | Written by | Original release date |
|---|---|---|---|---|---|
| 19 | 1 | "Stir Crazy" | Vern Gillum | Steve Bello | October 3, 1993 |
| 20 | 2 | "Railroaded" | John McPherson | Loyal Truesdale | October 10, 1993 |
| 21 | 3 | "The Crucibles" | Vern Gillum | Jack Thibeau | October 17, 1993 |
| 22 | 4 | "Capone's Return" | John McPherson | Loyal Truesdale | October 24, 1993 |
| 23 | 5 | "Cuba: Part 1" | Colin Bucksey | Alfonse Ruggiero | October 31, 1993 |
| 24 | 6 | "Cuba: Part 2" | John McPherson | Steve Bello & Brad Markowitz | November 7, 1993 |
| 25 | 7 | "Radical Solution" | Colin Bucksey | Brad Markowitz | November 14, 1993 |
| 26 | 8 | "The General" | John McPherson | Jack Thibeau | November 21, 1993 |
| 27 | 9 | "Attack on New York" | Aaron Lipstadt | Jack Thibeau | November 28, 1993 |
| 28 | 10 | "Mind Games" | Mario DiLeo | Story by : Brad Markowitz & Barbara Nance; Teleplay by : Steve Bello & Brad Markowitz | January 2, 1994 |
| 29 | 11 | "The Skin Trade" | James Quinn | Morgan Gendel | January 9, 1994 |
| 30 | 12 | "The Legacy" | James Quinn | Dan Peterson | January 23, 1994 |
| 31 | 13 | "Only for You" | Cliff Bole | Sheldon Renan | January 30, 1994 |
| 32 | 14 | "Stadt" | John McPherson | Jack Thibeau | February 6, 1994 |
| 33 | 15 | "Til Death Do Us Part" | Vern Gillum | Alfonse Ruggiero | February 13, 1994 |
| 34 | 16 | "The Last Gauntlet" | John McPherson | David M. Wolf | February 20, 1994 |
| 35 | 17 | "Family Ties" | Vern Gillum | David Shore | February 27, 1994 |
| 36 | 18 | "The Fever" | Danny Aiello III | Steve Bello and Brad Markowitz | March 27, 1994 |
| 37 | 19 | "Voyeur" | Mario Di Leo | Jack Thibeau | April 3, 1994 |
| 38 | 20 | "Omerta" | Cliff Bole | Loyal Truesdale | April 24, 1994 |
| 39 | 21 | "Apocalypse in Chicago" | Tucker Gates | Tim Iacofano | May 1, 1994 |
| 40 | 22 | "Bury My Heart at Starved Rock" | Vern Gillum | Morgan Gendel | May 8, 1994 |
| 41 | 23 | "Death and Taxes: Part 1" | John McPherson | Steve Bello & Brad Markowitz | May 15, 1994 |
| 42 | 24 | "Death and Taxes: Part 2" | Tucker Gates | Alfonse Ruggiero | May 22, 1994 |
