= Barry Alexander Brown =

American film director and film editor

- Born: 28 November 1960 (age 64); Warrington, Cheshire, England
- Occupation(s): Film director, film editor
- Years active: 1979–present

Barry Alexander Brown (born 28 November 1960 in Warrington, Cheshire) is an English born-American film director and editor. As a film editor, he is best known for collaborations with film director Spike Lee, editing some of Lee's best known films including Do the Right Thing (1989), Malcolm X (1992), He Got Game (1998), 25th Hour (2002), Inside Man (2006), and BlacKkKlansman (2018), the latter of which earned him a nomination for the Academy Award for Best Film Editing at the 91st Academy Awards.

As a film director, Brown co-directed the documentary film The War at Home (1979), for which he was nominated for an Academy Award for Best Documentary Feature; he was one of the youngest nominees for the category. In 2020, Son of the South was a feature film that he wrote, edited and directed and was better received in Europe than the United States. It was honored at many film festivals and was selected to be taught in the French public school system. Some of his other film directing credits include The Who's Tommy, the Amazing Journey (1993), a documentary film about The Who's Tommy album, and the feature films Winning Girls Through Psychic Mind Control (2002), starring Bronson Pinchot and Son of the South (2020). Brown has also edited music videos for Michael Jackson, Prince, Stevie Wonder, Public Enemy and Arrested Development.

He is a former associate professor of Film Studies at Columbia University.
