= Syd Butler =

American musician (born 1972)

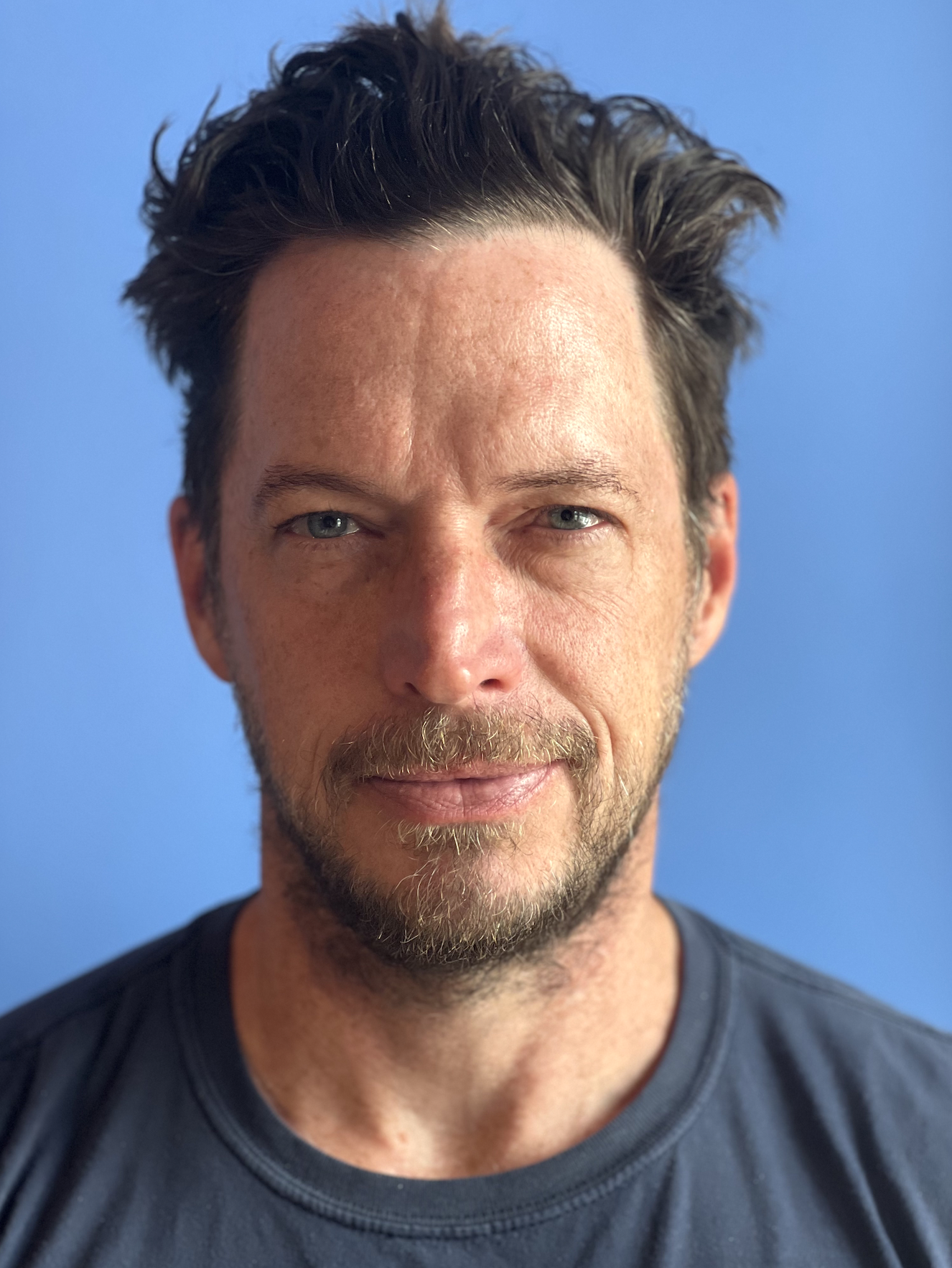
- Butler in 2023
- Born: August 15, 1972 (age 54); Memphis, Tennessee, U.S.
- Occupations: Bass Player in Les Savy Fav, Founder of Frenchkiss Records, Head of A&R at Killphonic Rights
- Spouse: Amy Carlson (2004–present)
- Children: 2

Syd Butler (born August 15, 1972) is an American musician and co-founder of the indie rock and post-hardcore band Les Savy Fav. In 1999, he founded Frenchkiss Records. Butler also served as the bassist for the 8G Band, the house band for Late Night with Seth Meyers, from 2014 to 2024.

== Early life ==
Butler was born on August 15, 1972, in Memphis, Tennessee, to Syd and Kay Butler. Although born in Tennessee, he spent most of his adolescence in Washington, D.C. Growing up during the rise of Dischord Records in the 1980s, Butler was influenced by the label, which later inspired the creation of Frenchkiss Records. After high school, he attended the Rhode Island School of Design.

== Career ==
While attending college, Butler co-founded the indie rock band Les Savy Fav.

In 1999, Butler launched Frenchkiss Records from an office in New York City's Meatpacking District to release Les Savy Fav’s second album, The Cat and the Cobra. The label quickly expanded, signing bands such as The Hold Steady, Local Natives, The Dodos, Bloc Party and Passion Pit. In 2010, Butler formed Frenchkiss Publishing in partnership with BMG Chrysalis. Frenchkiss Label Group was subsequently created to support smaller labels like ATP Recordings, Cavity Search, and Underwater Peoples.

Butler has also been involved in various musical side projects, including Juiced Elfers with Nicholas Thorburn and Desiderata with Amanda McKaye. In 2012, he formed the short-term band Office Romance with Les Savy Fav bandmate Seth Jabour and wife Amy Carlson, releasing the I Love The Holidays EP. On April 22, 2012, Butler published Who Farted Wrong?, a collection of humorous drawings and anecdotes, through Write Bloody Publishing.

From 2014 to 2024, Butler was the bassist for the 8G band, the house band for Late Night with Seth Meyers, formed by his longtime friend Fred Armisen. Alongside Armisen, Eli Janney, Marnie Stern, and Jabour, Butler performed with the band.

In September of 2024, Butler was promoted to Head of A&R at the music publishing company Killphonic Rights.

=== Directed Videos ===
- Les Savy Fav
- Limo Scene (2024)
- Patty Lee (2008)
- The Dodos
- Winter (2008)
- Ex Models
- Sex Automata (2008)

== Music Awards ==
Nominated for the 76th Primetime Creative Arts Emmy Awards as a member of the 8G Band for Late Night with Seth Meyers (Fred Armisen & Eli Janney for Outstanding Music Direction).

SESAC Network TV Performance Award Winner: 2019, 2021, 2022.
