= Les Savy Fav =

American indie rock band

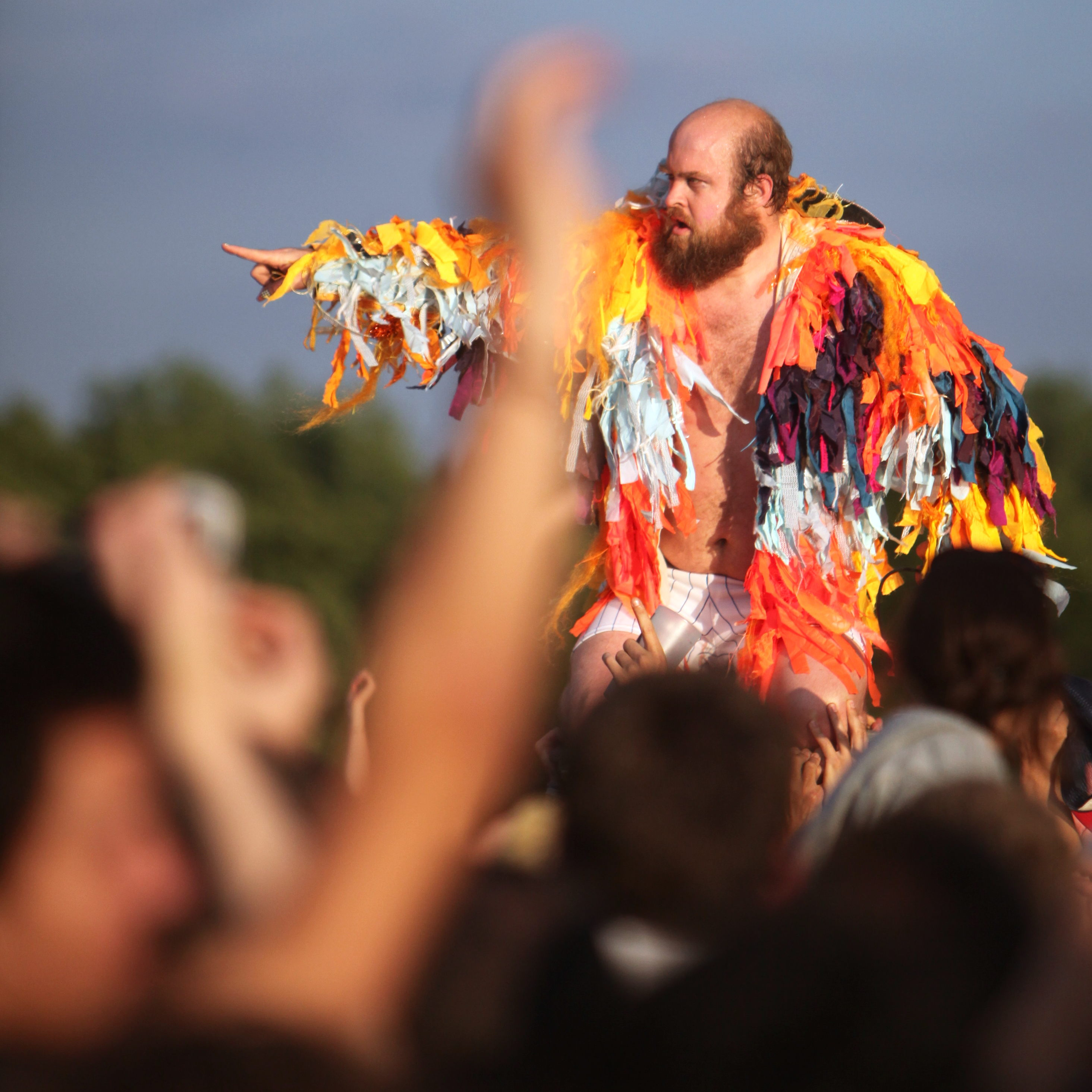
- Les Savy Fav at the Eurockéennes 2011

Background information
- Origin: Providence, Rhode Island, U.S.
- Genres: Indie rock; math rock; post-punk revival; post-hardcore; art punk; noise rock
- Years active: 1995–present
- Labels: Frenchkiss, Wichita
- Members: Tim Harrington; Seth Jabour; Syd Butler; Harrison Haynes; Andrew Reuland
- Past members: Gibb Slife; Pat Mahoney
- Website: lessavyfav.com

Les Savy Fav (/leɪ ˈsɑːvi ˈfɑːv/ lay SAH-vee FAHV) is an American indie rock band based in New York City. Their style is influenced by art punk and post-hardcore. The group is known for the stage presence of lead singer Tim Harrington. The band is signed to Frenchkiss Records, which is owned by the band's bassist, Syd Butler.

== History ==
The group's original 1995 line-up all met while attending the Rhode Island School of Design in Providence, Rhode Island. Live shows are punctuated by the antics of frontman Harrington, including interacting with audience members and on-stage wardrobe changes. The rest of the band continues to play as if nothing out of the ordinary is happening. Guitar player Gibb Slife left the band after their second LP. Drummer Mahoney was replaced by Harrison Haynes.

The band started a planned hiatus in mid-2005, which led to speculation that they might have broken up, but Harrington confirmed that Les Savy Fav would return and indeed they did, playing a live performance at the British All Tomorrow's Parties festival in May 2007. Andrew Reuland joined the band in 2006 as the second guitar player. The band booked studio time in November of that year to record their fourth full-length album, Let's Stay Friends, which was released September 18, 2007. They performed "Patty Lee" live on Late Night with Conan O'Brien on January 31, 2008. Their song "Hold Onto Your Genre" is featured in the soundtrack to MLB 2K7, as well as commercials for the game. Furthermore, their song "Raging in the Plague Age" is featured on an in-game radio station in GTA IV.

Bass player Syd Butler is also the owner of Frenchkiss Records. Seth Jabour is also known for his work as an illustrator and graphic designer. Former drummer Pat Mahoney also played in LCD Soundsystem.

The Derry/London based band Jetplane Landing included a song on their 2007 album Backlash Cop entitled "Why Do They Never Play Les Savy Fav On The Radio?"

The song "The Sweat Descends" appears in the commercial for the Cartoon Network movie, "Fire Breather", as well as the soundtrack for College Hoops 2K7.

The 2011 True Blood episode 'Let's Get Out of Here' was named for the band's song, which is featured in the episode.

In December 2011, the band co-curated the All Tomorrow's Parties "Nightmare Before Christmas" festival in Minehead, England alongside Battles and Caribou. The song "The Equestrian" is featured on the soundtrack for NHL 2K8. Some of the band's members are now in the house band for Late Night With Seth Meyers.

In 2020, the band was booked to play at Primavera Sound's twentieth anniversary.

In February 2024 the band released its first new single in 14 years, "Legendary Tippers". Later in the month it announced their sixth album, and first for over a decade, Oui, LSF. They also released the single "Guzzle Blood".

== Musical style ==
Initially, their music featured an abrasive sound fitting in the noise rock genre and reminiscent of the music of Fugazi and Jawbox. Later, their music became more idiosyncratic, shifting to a more radio-friendly sound close to that of befriended bands Bloc Party and Enon. Kele Okereke of Bloc Party wrote of Les Savy Fav's influence on his band for an article in The Observer in 2005, and members of Enon have contributed to several Les Savy Fav tracks.

== Discography ==
=== Studio albums ===
- 3/5 (1997, Self-Starter Foundation)
- The Cat and the Cobra (1999, Frenchkiss Records/Self-Starter Foundation)
- Go Forth (2001, Frenchkiss Records)
- Let's Stay Friends (2007, Frenchkiss Records)
- Root for Ruin (September 2010, Frenchkiss Records)
- Oui, LSF (May 2024, Frenchkiss Records)

=== EPs ===
- Emor: Rome Upside Down (2000, Southern Records)

=== Live albums ===
- After the Balls Drop, (2008, Frenchkiss) (Digital-only release)

=== Compilations ===
- Repopulation Program, Les Savy Fav contribute Raise Buildings. (1996, Load Records)
- This Is Next Year: A Brooklyn-Based Compilation, Les Savy Fav contribute No Sleeves. (2001, Arena Rock Recording Co.)
- Inches, a compilation of singles from 1995 to 2004 (2004, Frenchkiss; re-released 2008 on Wichita Recordings)
- Warm & Scratchy, Les Savy Fav contribute The Equestrian. (2007, Adult Swim)

=== Singles ===
- "Rodeo" (1997)
- "Our Coastal Hymn" (1999)
- "Reprobates Resume" (2001)
- "Reformat (Dramatic Reading)" (2001)
- "Obsessed with the Excess" (2003)
- "Yawn, Yawn, Yawn" (2003)
- "Hold On to Your Genre" (2004)
- "Knowing How the World Works" (2004)
- "The Sweat Descends" (2004)
- "We'll Make a Lover of You" (2004)
- "Accidental Deaths/Hit by Car" (2006)
- "Raging in the Plague Age" (2006)
- "What Would Wolves Do?" (2007)
- "Patty Lee" (2008)
- "Let's Get Out of Here" (2010) UK Sales No. 92
- “Legendary Tippers” (2024)
- "Guzzle Blood" (2024)
