= Tim Harrington (singer) =

American musician and designer

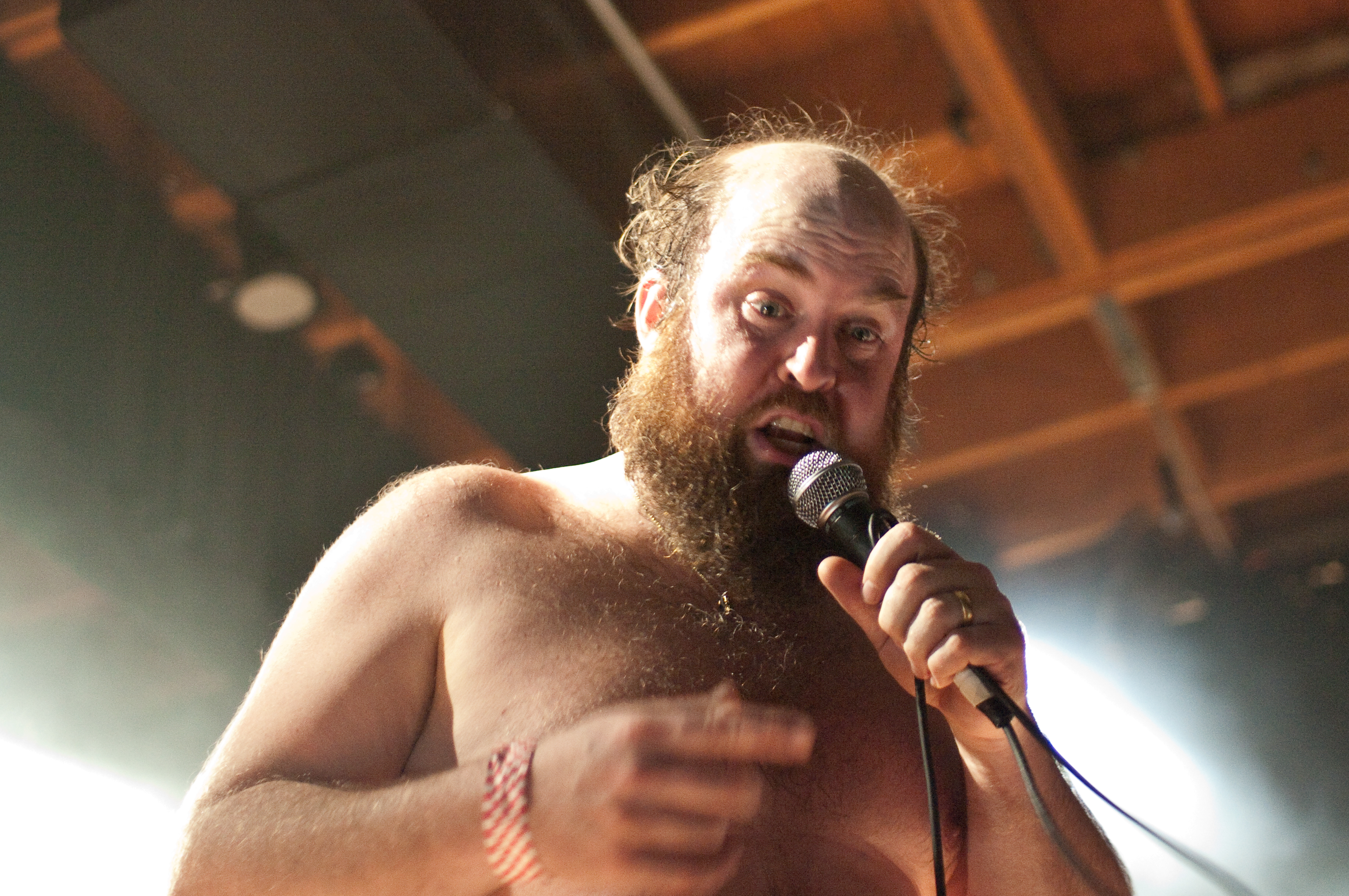
- Tim Harrington of Les Savy Fav performs at the Noise Pop Festival in San Francisco on March 1, 2009

Background information
- Born: United States
- Genres: Indie rock; Math rock; Post-punk revival; Post-hardcore; Art punk; Noise rock
- Instrument: Vocals
- Years active: 1995–present
- Label: Frenchkiss Records

Tim Harrington is an American musician and designer who has been the lead singer of New York indie rock band Les Savy Fav since they formed while together at Rhode Island School of Design (RISD) in 1995. He is notable for his energetic stage performances which often include multiple changes of clothing and performing in his underwear. He describes his style as "acting entirely by my own desire and what moves me. I've always felt like the only real people I'm particularly trying to entertain are the rest of the guys in the band and myself". He fronted a video series called "Beardo" on Pitchfork Media.

Harrington has also been a professional designer, illustrator, and fine artist since 1996, creating a range of "bummer postcards" and illustrations, including the sleeve art for Les Savy Fav albums. He launched a line of textiles and patterned products with his wife Anna called Deadly Squire. In May 2013 HarperCollins' Balzer & Bray published his interactive children's picture book called "This Little Piggy", which was described as a "humorous, fresh take on the nursery rhyme ‘This Little Piggy,’ featuring drumming, dancing, and superhero toes."

In May 2024, Harrington revealed he has been diagnosed with bipolar disorder.
