= Frenchkiss Records =

Independent record label based in New York, New York

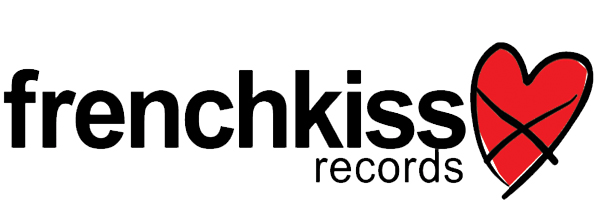
- Parent company: Sony Music Entertainment
- Founded: 1999
- Founder: Syd Butler
- Defunct: 2014
- Distributor: The Orchard
- Genre: Indie rock
- Country of origin: U.S.
- Location: New York City
- Official website: www.frenchkissrecords.com

Frenchkiss Records is an independent record label based in New York City. The label was started in 1999 by Syd Butler, bassist and founder of Les Savy Fav. The label's first purpose was to release Les Savy Fav's second album The Cat and The Cobra, but has since been the label responsible for discovering a varying array of artists such as the Hold Steady, the Antlers, the Dodos, Local Natives and Passion Pit. The label has recently added a music publishing side as well, Frenchkiss Publishing.

The company was acquired by The Orchard in September 2014.

== Frenchkiss Label Group ==
In early 2012 Frenchkiss Records launched the distribution company Frenchkiss Label Group, which is "focused on growing visibility for indie labels in the spirit of communities such as Dischord, Rough Trade and Touch & Go." In May of that year Cavity Search Records was announced as one of the first nine labels to join the Frenchkiss distribution group, along with JAXART and Pendu Sound. At that point, Frenchkiss had ceased its affiliation with RED, and had begun working with The Orchard.

== Artists ==
- 1,2,3
- The Antlers
- The Apes
- The Big Sleep
- Bloc Party
- The Bright Light Social Hour
- Call Me Lightning
- Crocodiles
- Cut Off Your Hands
- Detachment Kit
- Devin
- Diet Cig
- The Dodos
- Drowners
- The Drums
- Eleanor Friedberger
- Emma Louise
- Ex Models
- Freelance Whales
- Future Generations
- Hello Mary
- The Hold Steady
- Les Savy Fav
- Lifter Puller
- Local Natives
- The Plastic Constellations
- Passion Pit
- Sean Na Na
- Suckers
- Tangiers
- Thunderbirds are Now!
- Turing Machine
- Twen

== See also ==
- List of record labels
