= 1997 in music =

This is a list of notable events in music that took place in the year 1997.

== Specific locations ==
- 1997 in British music
- 1997 in Norwegian music
- 1997 in Scandinavian music
- 1997 in South Korean music

== Specific genres ==
- 1997 in classical music
- 1997 in country music
- 1997 in heavy metal music
- 1997 in hip-hop
- 1997 in jazz
- 1997 in Latin music
- 1997 in progressive rock

== Events ==
=== January ===
- January 1 – Townes Van Zandt dies of a cardiac arrhythmia.
- January 6 – Scottish band Texas release first single, "Say What You Want" from their 6× Platinum album "White on Blonde"
- January 7 – The Spice Girls release their debut single, "Wannabe" in the U.S. and premiere the music video eighteen days later.
- January 9 – David Bowie performs his 50th Birthday Bash concert (the day after his birthday) at Madison Square Garden, New York City, USA with guests Frank Black, Foo Fighters, Sonic Youth, Robert Smith of The Cure, Lou Reed, and Billy Corgan of The Smashing Pumpkins, with the opening act Placebo. Proceeds from the concert went to the Save the Children fund.
- January 10 – James Brown receives a star on the Hollywood Walk of Fame in Hollywood, USA.
- January 17–February 2 – The Big Day Out festival takes place in Australia and New Zealand, headlined by Soundgarden, The Offspring and The Prodigy. Sepultura are originally named in the lineup, but cancel their performance after the departure of former frontman Max Cavalera in December 1996. They are later replaced by Fear Factory.
- January 19 – Madonna wins Best Actress In A Motion Picture, Musical Or Comedy, for her part in Evita, at the 54th annual Golden Globe Awards in the USA.
- January 20 – Daft Punk releases their debut studio album Homework.
- January 28
  - The Virginia Senate votes to retire "Carry Me Back to Old Virginny" as the official state song, and begins looking for a replacement.
  - Clive Davis gets a star on the Hollywood Walk of Fame.

=== February ===
- February 2 – Rich Mullins' musical The Canticle of the Plains receives its première in Wichita, Kansas.
- February 3 – Scottish band Texas release their fourth album "White on Blonde"
- February 12 – David Bowie receives a star on the Hollywood Walk of Fame in Hollywood, USA.
- February 13
  - Michael Jackson's first son, Michael Joseph Jackson Jr., is born.
  - The Spice Girls knock Toni Braxton's "Unbreak My Heart" off the top spot in the US singles chart. They are the first female British group to have a US number one with their debut single.
- February 20 – Ben and Jerry's introduce "Phish Food", a new flavor of ice cream named after the rock group Phish. The ingredients are chocolate ice cream, marshmallows, caramel and fish-shaped fudge.
- February 24 – The Spice Girls win Best Video for "Say You'll Be There" and Best Single for "Wannabe" at the BRIT Awards. Geri Halliwell's Union Jack dress from the girls' live performance hogs the headlines the next day.
- February 26 – The 39th Annual Grammy Awards are presented in New York, hosted by Ellen DeGeneres. Babyface wins the most awards with four, while Celine Dion's Falling into You wins Album of the Year and Eric Clapton's "Change the World" wins both Record of the Year and Song of the Year. LeAnn Rimes wins Best New Artist.
- February 28 – Death Row Records co-founder Suge Knight is sentenced to nine years in prison for violating his probation. He would be released in August 2001.

=== March ===
- March 1
  - Pianist David Helfgott performs at the Boston Symphony Hall, in Boston, USA, during his world tour. The Boston Globe describes his performance as "without phrasing, form, harmonic understanding, differentiation of style and often basic accuracy; worst of all, it was without emotional content".
  - The jam band Phish records "Slip Stitch and Pass" live at Markthalle, Hamburg, Germany.
- March 9
  - The Notorious B.I.G. is shot dead while sitting in the passenger seat of a car after a post Soul Train Awards party in Los Angeles, CA.
  - The Spice Girls become the first act in the history of the UK Top 40 singles charts to have four consecutive number one hits with "Mama"/"Who Do You Think You Are". Profits from the single go to Comic Relief and provide the biggest individual contribution of 1997.
- March 10 – A Marilyn Manson concert in Columbia, South Carolina is canceled in response to pressure from religious and civic groups.
- March 11 – Paul McCartney is knighted by Elizabeth II.
- March 17 – Whirlwind Heat play their first show.
- March 19–20 – The reunited The Monkees perform two sold-out concerts at Wembley Arena in London, UK.
- March 30 – The Spice Girls launch Britain's new television channel, Channel 5.

=== April ===
- April 2 – Joni Mitchell is reunited with her daughter, Kilauren Gibb, whom she gave up for adoption 32 years earlier.
- April 7 – Wynton Marsalis becomes the first jazz artist to win the Pulitzer Prize for Music.
- April 10 – Nigel Kennedy, now calling himself simply Kennedy, returns to the stage at the Royal Festival Hall after a five-year absence from the concert stage resulting from neck surgery.
- April 14 – Creed releases their debut studio album My Own Prison.
- April 15 – Hanson releases "MMMBop", one of the most successful debut singles of all time, reaching number one in 27 countries.
- April 25–27 – The first Terrastock festival is held in Providence, Rhode Island, USA.

=== May ===
- May 3
  - 5ive's musical career begins after auditions are held in London, UK to find potential band members, with over 3,000 hopefuls showing up to audition.
  - The Spice Girls attend the Cannes Film Festival to announce their plans to hit the big screen with Spiceworld: The Movie. A photo call on top of the Hotel Martinez entrance brings the area to a standstill.
  - At the 42nd Eurovision Song Contest, held in Dublin's Point Theatre, the UK win with "Love Shine a Light", sung by Katrina and the Waves.
  - The Notorious B.I.G.'s single "Hypnotize" is #1 for three weeks.
- May 6 – The Rock and Roll Hall of Fame induction ceremony is held in Cleveland at the site of the hall itself for the first time. Prior to this year, the ceremony had only been held in New York City.
- May 11 – The Spice Girls perform their first British live gig for the Prince's Trust 21st anniversary concert at the Manchester Opera House. They break royal protocol by kissing the Prince of Wales (now Charles III) on the cheeks and even pinching his bottom.
- May 15 – The Spice Girls' album Spice reaches number one on the US charts, making them the first British act to top the charts with a debut album.
- May 20 - Foo Fighters release their second studio album The Colour and the Shape.
- May 21 – Radiohead releases OK Computer.
- May 23 – Brainiac frontman Tim Taylor is killed in a car crash at age 29 driving to his Dayton, Ohio home. The band announces they will not continue.
- May 24 – The first Ozzfest tour kicks off at the Nissan Pavilion in Washington, D.C., featuring Pantera and a reconstituted Black Sabbath with three of the four original members.
- May 26 – NSYNC releases their debut album NSYNC.
- May 27 - Kirk Franklin releases his fourth album (first collaboration album with God’s Property) God’s Property from Kirk Franklin’s Nu Nation which spawned the crossover hit single “Stomp”
- May 28 – Japanese pop singer and songwriter Miho Komatsu releases her first and debut song entitled Nazo. It is used as an opening soundtrack in popular hit anime Detective Conan.

=== June ===
- June 14 – Puff Daddy and The Family's "I'll Be Missing You" single is #1 on the Hot 100 charts for the next 11 weeks, only to be replaced by The Notorious B.I.G. posthumous single "Mo Money Mo Problems", also featuring Puff Daddy.
- June 24 – Disney-owned Hollywood Records drops Insane Clown Posse from their roster and pulls the album The Great Milenko after only six hours of release, in an attempt to placate the Southern Baptist Church who were threatening to boycott the company for straying from its family-friendly image. The controversy generates tremendous publicity for the band, who soon sign with Island Records.
- June 29 – Missy Elliott releases the single "The Rain (Supa Dupa Fly)" from her debut album Supa Dupa Fly.

=== July–August ===
- July 1 – Transfer of sovereignty over Hong Kong to China: Tan Dun's Symphony 1997: Heaven, Earth, Mankind for orchestra, biānzhōng bells, children's chorus and solo cello is premièred as part of the official ceremony.
- July 5 – The first Lilith Fair tour kicks off at The Gorge Amphitheatre in George, Washington. Sarah McLachlan, Tracy Chapman and Jewel are among the performers.
- July 15–20 – The second Yoyo A Go Go punk and indie rock festival opens in Olympia, Washington.
- August 3 – The Black Crowes perform their last show with Johnny Colt and Marc Ford.
- August 4 – Nigerian afrobeat pioneer and dissident pop star Fela Anikulapo-Kuti dies in Lagos, Nigeria, of HIV-related illness.
- August 7 – Garth Brooks performs to an estimated 800,000 to one million people during a free concert given in Central Park, New York City.
- August 11 – The Backstreet Boys release their second international album, Backstreet's Back.
- August 12 – The Backstreet Boys release their U.S. debut album, Backstreet Boys.
- August 14 – Godspeed You! Black Emperor releases debut album, F♯ A♯ ∞
- August 16–17 – Phish perform at the two-day music festival, The Great Went, at Loring Air Force Base in Limestone, Maine, US. They play 500 minutes of music, six sets and two encores. There is an estimated attendance of between 65,000 and 70,000, and it is the top-grossing concert of the season, making over $4,000,000 in box office receipts.
- August 19 – The reunited Fleetwood Mac begin a concert tour in the United States.
- August 30 – "Mo Money Mo Problems" reaches #1 on the Hot 100 singles chart, making The Notorious B.I.G. the first artist to achieve two posthumous #1 singles.

=== September–October ===
- September 6 – Elton John performs "Candle in the Wind" at the funeral of Diana, Princess of Wales; John Tavener's "Song for Athene" is performed at the same ceremony, with soprano Lynne Dawson singing the solo part.
- September 16
  - After a tumultuous divorce from her first husband, Mariah Carey releases the album Butterfly, which moved her sound in a more hip-hop/R&B direction.
  - Aaliyah releases the single "Hot Like Fire"/"The One I Gave My Heart To".
- September 17 – The KLF return for 23 minutes with their performance of "Fuck the Millennium".
- September 19 – While on his way to a benefit concert in Kansas, USA, Rich Mullins loses control of his Jeep, flipping the automobile and throwing both Mullins and passenger Mitch McVicker out onto the road. A tractor-trailer approaching the scene swerves to miss McVicker, striking and killing Mullins instantly. McVicker survives, but suffers major injuries.
- September 20 – U2 plays at Reggio Emilia during their PopMart Tour to over 150,000 people.
- September 22 – Björk releases Homogenic, moving towards a darker sound and away from her 'pixie' image.
- September 23 – U2 perform a concert in Sarajevo during their PopMart Tour.
- September 27 – Bob Dylan performs for Pope John Paul II at a Catholic youth event in Bologna, Italy.
- September 29
  - The Rolling Stones release Bridges to Babylon.
  - The Verve release Urban Hymns. In a controversial legal dispute, the majority of their royalties and songwriting credit for their single "Bitter Sweet Symphony" go to The Rolling Stones.
- October 7 – Everclear release their multi-platinum third album So Much for the Afterglow, containing "Father of Mine" and "I Will Buy You a New Life".
- October 13 – The "Prince Igor" single, jointly performed by The Rhapsody, Warren G and Sissel Kyrkjebø is released.
- October 15 – Michael Jackson ends the HIStory World Tour, which included an attendance record of 4,500,000 fans, in Durban, South Africa.
- October 22 – Namie Amuro shocks her fans when she announces that she has recently married and is three months pregnant. She subsequently begins a one-year hiatus from the music industry.
- October 23 – R.E.M. drummer Bill Berry announces his departure from the group.
- October 25 – The 26th OTI Festival, held at Plaza Mayor in Lima, Peru, is won by the song "Se diga lo que se diga", written by Francisco Curiel and Josemanuel Fernández, and performed by Iridián representing Mexico.

=== November–December ===
- November 3 – The Spice Girls release Spiceworld, their second number one album, making the group the first British band since The Beatles to have two albums in the US chart at the same time. Spice and Spiceworld have amassed enough sales for one out of every two people in Britain to own a Spice Girls album.
- November 4 – Shania Twain releases her album Come On Over which goes on to sell over 40 million copies worldwide to date and later became the biggest selling album in country music history and the biggest selling album by a female music artist.
- November 6 – The Spice Girls make the decision to take over the running of the group and drop Simon Fuller as their manager.
- November 18 – American indie rock band Modest Mouse release their second full-length album, The Lonesome Crowded West.
- November 19 – Gary Glitter is arrested after images of child pornography are found on a laptop computer that he had taken in for repairs.
- November 22 – INXS lead singer Michael Hutchence is found dead in a Sydney, Australia hotel room, aged 37.
- November 25 – Will Smith releases his debut solo studio album Big Willie Style.
- November 26 – In a performance billed as the "highest" gig on Earth, Spiritualized play in the deck of the CN Tower in Toronto, Ontario, Canada for an audience of 150 people.
- November 27 – Namie Amuro releases her ninth single under Avex Trax, "Dreaming I Was Dreaming."
- December 1 – Aaron Carter bursts onto the music scene at the age of 10 with the release of his debut album Aaron Carter, making him the youngest male artist in the world since Michael Jackson in 1969.
- December 4-5 – Black Sabbath perform a pair of reunion shows in their hometown of Birmingham, England. They are the first full-length concerts by the original lineup of the band since 1978.
- December 10 – Faith Hill and LeAnn Rimes at the Christmas Time with Eddy Arnold.
- December 26 – The Spice Girls release their big screen debut Spiceworld: The Movie, starring Richard E. Grant, Roger Moore, Elton John and Stephen Fry. The movie makes £6.8m in its first week of release.
- December 31
  - The Home of Country Music, the Opryland USA theme park, in Nashville, Tennessee, USA closes and is subsequently demolished.
  - Namie Amuro performs on NHK Kōhaku Uta Gassen for the last time before beginning her maternal hiatus.

=== Also in 1997 ===
- Mikael Åkerfeldt and Peter Lindgren fire Johan De Farfalla from Opeth; then Anders Nordin quits the band. To replace the ex-members, Mike and Pete hire Martin Lopez and Martin Mendez.
- The companies Memorex, Maxell, and TDK introduce blank recordable CDs.
- The first John Lennon Songwriting Contest is held.
- Rob Gommerman leaves Finger Eleven due to extensive touring.
- Derrick Green replaces Max Cavalera in Sepultura.
- Glenn Ljungström and Johan Larsson leave In Flames.
- Big Audio Dynamite's final album Entering a New Ride, which features Ranking Roger from The Beat, gets rejected for release by their record label, so is released independently as one of the first ever well known musical downloads, for free on their website.

== Bands formed ==
- See Category:Musical groups established in 1997

== Bands disbanded ==
- See Category:Musical groups disestablished in 1997

== Bands reformed ==
- As Friends Rust (reformed with a new line-up and in a new location after breaking up earlier that year)
- Blondie (reformed after broke up in 1982)
- Depeche Mode (reformed after being on hiatus since 1995)
- Echo & the Bunnymen (reformed after being on hiatus since 1992)
- Jane's Addiction (reformed after broke up in 1991)
- Sunny Day Real Estate (reformed after being on hiatus since 1995)

== Albums released ==
- See: Category:1997 albums

=== January – March ===
Date		Album	Artist	Notes
J A N U A R Y	7	Six of Hearts	Kenny G	EP
J A N U A R Y	7	Enjoy Incubus	Incubus	EP
J A N U A R Y	10	The Best and the Rest	Savatage	Compilation
J A N U A R Y	10	Firefly	TNT	-
J A N U A R Y	14	Justuss	Snow	-
J A N U A R Y	14	Live Stages	Vertical Horizon	Live
J A N U A R Y	14	Rhyme & Reason	Various Artists	Soundtrack
J A N U A R Y	20	Homework	Daft Punk	UK; US release date 25 March
J A N U A R Y	21	Happy 2b Hardcore	Anabolic Frolic	DJ Mix
J A N U A R Y	21	Dragon Attack: A Tribute to Queen	Various Artists	Tribute
J A N U A R Y	21	Vivir	Enrique Iglesias	-
J A N U A R Y	21	Slick Shoes EP	Slick Shoes	EP
J A N U A R Y	21	Soft Effects	Spoon	EP
J A N U A R Y	23	Clumsy	Our Lady Peace	Canada; US release date 2 April
J A N U A R Y	27	Glow	Reef	-
J A N U A R Y	27	Written in Red	The Stranglers	-
J A N U A R Y	28	11 Transistor	Lazlo Bane	-
J A N U A R Y	28	The Full Sentence	Pigeonhed	-
J A N U A R Y	28	Gridlock'd	Various Artists	Soundtrack
J A N U A R Y	28	In a Metal Mood: No More Mr. Nice Guy	Pat Boone	Covers CD
J A N U A R Y	28	Lie to Me	Jonny Lang	-
J A N U A R Y	28	Perfect from Now On	Built to Spill	-
J A N U A R Y	28	Uptown Saturday Night	Camp Lo	-
J A N U A R Y	29	Nuyorican Soul	Nuyorican Soul	Debut
J A N U A R Y	?	Bagsy Me	The Wannadies	-
J A N U A R Y	?	Come My Fanatics...	Electric Wizard	
F E B R U A R Y	3	Freak Show	Silverchair	-
F E B R U A R Y	3	Earthling	David Bowie	-
F E B R U A R Y	3	White on Blonde	Texas	-
F E B R U A R Y	3	C'est pour vivre	Celine Dion	Compilation
F E B R U A R Y	3	Sex Style	Kool Keith	-
F E B R U A R Y	4	Bombs & Butterflies	Widespread Panic	-
F E B R U A R Y	4	Handsome	Handsome	Debut
F E B R U A R Y	4	Ixnay on the Hombre	The Offspring	-
F E B R U A R Y	4	Love Travels	Kathy Mattea	-
F E B R U A R Y	4	Old Friends from Young Years	Papa Roach	Debut
F E B R U A R Y	4	Tony Bennett on Holiday	Tony Bennett	-
F E B R U A R Y	7	SubUrbia	Various Artists	Soundtrack
F E B R U A R Y	7	True Believer	Troy Cassar-Daley	-
F E B R U A R Y	10	Blur	Blur	-
F E B R U A R Y	10	A Short Album About Love	The Divine Comedy	-
F E B R U A R Y	11	Baduizm	Erykah Badu	Debut
F E B R U A R Y	11	Beautiful World	Big Head Todd and the Monsters	-
F E B R U A R Y	11	Brighten the Corners	Pavement	-
F E B R U A R Y	11	Built to Last	Sick of It All	-
F E B R U A R Y	11	City	Strapping Young Lad	-
F E B R U A R Y	11	City of Refuge	John Fahey	-
F E B R U A R Y	11	Coal Chamber	Coal Chamber	Debut
F E B R U A R Y	11	Dangerous Ground (Music from the Original Motion Picture)	Various Artists	Soundtrack
F E B R U A R Y	11	Eight Arms to Hold You	Veruca Salt	-
F E B R U A R Y	11	I Like It When You Die	Anal Cunt	-
F E B R U A R Y	11	Paco... Drop the Chicken	Salmon	-
F E B R U A R Y	11	Show World	Redd Kross	-
F E B R U A R Y	11	Sweet Homewrecker	Thrush Hermit	-
F E B R U A R Y	11	Unchained Melody: The Early Years	LeAnn Rimes	Recorded 1994–96
F E B R U A R Y	17	Oxygene 7-13	Jean Michel Jarre	-
F E B R U A R Y	17	Attack of the Grey Lantern	Mansun	Debut
F E B R U A R Y	17	Live at the Wireless	Ash	Live
F E B R U A R Y	18	Lost Highway	Various Artists	Soundtrack
F E B R U A R Y	18	Payable on Death Live	P.O.D.	-
F E B R U A R Y	18	Petra Praise 2: We Need Jesus	Petra	-
F E B R U A R Y	18	Secret Samadhi	Live	-
F E B R U A R Y	18	Terra Incognita	Chris Whitley	-
F E B R U A R Y	24	Women in Technology	White Town	-
F E B R U A R Y	24	Orblivion	The Orb	-
F E B R U A R Y	24	'Til Death Do Us Unite	Sodom	-
F E B R U A R Y	25	The Beauty Process: Triple Platinum	L7	-
F E B R U A R Y	25	Becoming X	Sneaker Pimps	-
F E B R U A R Y	25	Beyond the Missouri Sky (Short Stories)	Charlie Haden and Pat Metheny	-
F E B R U A R Y	25	Booty Call	Various Artists	Soundtrack
F E B R U A R Y	25	Day Three of My New Life	Knapsack	-
F E B R U A R Y	25	Either/Or	Elliott Smith	-
F E B R U A R Y	25	Goodbye Ellston Avenue	Pinhead Gunpowder	Debut
F E B R U A R Y	25	Marcy Playground	Marcy Playground	-
F E B R U A R Y	25	Maximum Abduction	Hypocrisy	EP
F E B R U A R Y	25	Mega!! Kung Fu Radio	Powerman 5000	-
F E B R U A R Y	25	No Way	Run On	-
F E B R U A R Y	25	Slush	OP8	-
F E B R U A R Y	25	...Somewhere More Familiar	Sister Hazel	-
F E B R U A R Y	25	Whiplash	James	-
F E B R U A R Y	28	Fuel for the Hate Game	Hot Water Music	-
F E B R U A R Y	?	All Wound Up...	Godsmack	Debut
F E B R U A R Y	?	Best of Gloria Estefan	Gloria Estefan	Compilation
F E B R U A R Y	?	Kingdom of Madness	Edguy	-
M A R C H	3	10	Wet Wet Wet	-
M A R C H	3	The Boatman's Call	Nick Cave and the Bad Seeds	-
M A R C H	3	Electro Glide in Blue	Apollo 440	-
M A R C H	3	Nattens madrigal	Ulver	-
M A R C H	3	Pop	U2	-
M A R C H	4	Dan Bern	Dan Bern	Debut
M A R C H	4	Darkside	Necrophobic	-
M A R C H	4	Goldfly	Guster	-
M A R C H	4	The Healing Game	Van Morrison	-
M A R C H	4	Smilla’s Sense of Snow (Original Motion Picture Soundtrack)	Hans Zimmer and Harry Gregson-Williams	Soundtrack
M A R C H	4	The Soul Assassins, Chapter I	Soul Assassins	Debut
M A R C H	7	From the Gecko	The Slip	-
M A R C H	10	Dead Elvis	Death in Vegas	Debut
M A R C H	10	Extinct Instinct	Threshold	-
M A R C H	10	Still Waters	Bee Gees	-
M A R C H	11	Before You Were Punk	Various Artists	Compilation
M A R C H	11	City of Industry Soundtrack	Various Artists	Soundtrack
M A R C H	11	The Day Finger Pickers Took Over the World	Chet Atkins and Tommy Emmanuel	Collaboration between American guitarist Chet Atkins and Australian guitarist Tommy Emmanuel
M A R C H	11	Disciplined Breakdown	Collective Soul	-
M A R C H	11	Dutch Harbor – Where the Sea Breaks Its Back	Boxhead Ensemble	Soundtrack
M A R C H	11	Fake Can Be Just as Good	Blonde Redhead	-
M A R C H	11	Human	Christine Glass	Debut
M A R C H	11	Let's Face It	The Mighty Mighty Bosstones	-
M A R C H	11	Like Swimming	Morphine	-
M A R C H	11	Live at Hammersmith '79	Ted Nugent	Live 1979
M A R C H	11	Lula Divinia	Shiner	-
M A R C H	11	Message for Albert	Five for Fighting	-
M A R C H	11	Music from the Motion Picture Touch	Dave Grohl	Soundtrack
M A R C H	11	Rapture	Bradley Joseph	-
M A R C H	11	The Untouchable	Scarface	-
M A R C H	11	Violent Demise: The Last Days	Body Count	-
M A R C H	17	Before the Rain	Eternal	-
M A R C H	17	The Dismemberment Plan Is Terrified	The Dismemberment Plan	-
M A R C H	17	The Future of War	Atari Teenage Riot	-
M A R C H	18	Aftertaste	Helmet	-
M A R C H	18	Euphoria	Leftover Salmon	-
M A R C H	18	Grosse Point Blank (Original Soundtrack)	Various Artists	Soundtrack
M A R C H	18	Happy Town	Jill Sobule	-
M A R C H	18	Made in America	Aerosmith	EP
M A R C H	18	Nine Lives	Aerosmith	-
M A R C H	18	Selena	Selena	Soundtrack
M A R C H	18	Songs in the Key of Springfield	The Simpsons	-
M A R C H	18	Stealing Second	Chris Thile	-
M A R C H	18	Whatever and Ever Amen	Ben Folds Five	-
M A R C H	20	Blizzard Beasts	Immortal	-
M A R C H	21	In This Room	The 3rd and the Mortal	-
M A R C H	23	Sóknardalr	Windir	-
M A R C H	24	Aquí	Julieta Venegas	-
M A R C H	24	Now That's What I Call Music! 36 (UK series)	Various Artists	Compilation
M A R C H	24	Saturday Teenage Kick	Junkie XL	-
M A R C H	24	Skyscraping	ABC	-
M A R C H	24	Solid	U.D.O.	-
M A R C H	24	Some Things Never Change	Supertramp	-
M A R C H	24	White Trash Hell	Everclear	EP
M A R C H	25	Blue Sky on Mars	Matthew Sweet	-
M A R C H	25	The Buffalo Club	The Buffalo Club	-
M A R C H	25	Carnival of Chaos	Gwar	-
M A R C H	25	Chocolate Supa Highway	Spearhead	-
M A R C H	25	Come In and Burn	Rollins Band	-
M A R C H	25	Complicated	Tanya Tucker	-
M A R C H	25	Dust Bunnies	Bettie Serveert	-
M A R C H	25	Everything I Touch Runs Wild	Lori Carson	-
M A R C H	25	Everything You Want	Ray J	Debut
M A R C H	25	Fantastic Spikes Through Balloon	Skeleton Key	Debut
M A R C H	25	Hand It Over	Dinosaur Jr.	-
M A R C H	25	Hear in the Now Frontier	Queensrÿche	-
M A R C H	25	Life After Death	The Notorious B.I.G.	Sophomore
M A R C H	25	Livin' or Dyin'	Jack Ingram	-
M A R C H	25	Mingus Plays Piano	Charles Mingus	-
M A R C H	25	The More Things Change...	Machine Head	Sophomore
M A R C H	25	Must've Been High	Supersuckers	-
M A R C H	25	Natty Dread	Charlie Hunter	-
M A R C H	25	Nowhere: Music from the Gregg Araki Movie	Various Artists	Soundtrack
M A R C H	25	One More Time	Real McCoy	-
M A R C H	25	R&B Transmogrification	Quasi	-
M A R C H	25	So Long So Wrong	Alison Krauss	-
M A R C H	25	Take a Look Over Your Shoulder	Warren G	-
M A R C H	25	That Old Feeling (Music from the Motion Picture)	Various Artists	Soundtrack
M A R C H	25	Then: The Earlier Years	They Might Be Giants	Compilation
M A R C H	25	The Saint	Various Artists	Soundtrack
M A R C H	26	Aquarium	Aqua	Denmark
M A R C H	26	The Fawn	The Sea and Cake	-
M A R C H	26	Restless Heart	Whitesnake	Japan
M A R C H	26	Wild & Mild	Tokio	-
M A R C H	27	Kolme	Apulanta	Finland
M A R C H	31	Cowboy	Erasure	UK
M A R C H	31	Lost Blues and Other Songs	Palace Music	Compilation
M A R C H	?	Blue Roses from the Moons	Nanci Griffith	-
M A R C H	?	Space Avenue	Waltari	Finland
M A R C H	?	Wild Orchid	Wild Orchid	-

=== April – June ===
Date		Album	Artist	Notes
A P R I L	1	The Dillinger Escape Plan	The Dillinger Escape Plan	EP
A P R I L	1	Electro-Shock for President	Brainiac	EP
A P R I L	1	Midget Tossing	Yellowcard	Debut
A P R I L	1	Sisters of Avalon	Cyndi Lauper	Worldwide; released in Japan in '96
A P R I L	1	Songs: Ohia	Songs: Ohia	-
A P R I L	1	The Splinter Shards the Birth of Separation	Zao	-
A P R I L	1	Tripping the Light Fantastic	Lit	Debut
A P R I L	2	A Triumph for Man	Mew	-
A P R I L	4	Christie Front Drive	Christie Front Drive	-
A P R I L	4	En el Jardín del Corazón	Gandhi	-
A P R I L	4	The Phantom Lodge	Diabolical Masquerade	-
A P R I L	6	Enter	Within Temptation	-
A P R I L	7	Barafundle	Gorky's Zygotic Mynci	-
A P R I L	7	Dig Your Own Hole	The Chemical Brothers	-
A P R I L	7	Eld	Enslaved	-
A P R I L	7	How You Luv That	Big Tymers	-
A P R I L	7	Polydistortion	GusGus	-
A P R I L	8	12 Picks	Ace Frehley	Compilation
A P R I L	8	Broadway & 52nd	Us3	-
A P R I L	8	Dig Me Out	Sleater-Kinney	-
A P R I L	8	Retreat from the Sun	That Dog	-
A P R I L	8	Roll with the New	Chris Rock	-
A P R I L	8	Flesh And Bone	Richard Marx	-
A P R I L	8	Have I Offended Someone?	Frank Zappa	Compilation
A P R I L	8	Future Road	The Seekers	Australia. Their first studio album since 1968
A P R I L	8	The Messenger	Kurt Elling	-
A P R I L	8	Rock Collection	Pond	-
A P R I L	8	Stackin Chips	3X Krazy	-
A P R I L	8	Third Eye Blind	Third Eye Blind	Debut
A P R I L	8	Whole	Pedro the Lion	EP
A P R I L	9	A Toda Cuba le Gusta	Afro-Cuban All Stars	-
A P R I L	9	Everlasting	Every Little Thing	-
A P R I L	9	This Strange Engine	Marillion	-
A P R I L	11	Stardust We Are	The Flower Kings	-
A P R I L	12	Affluenza	Count Zero	-
A P R I L	12	Ljubavi Moja Jedina	Maja Blagdan	Croatia
A P R I L	14	Mother Nature Calls	Cast	-
A P R I L	14	My Own Prison	Creed	Debut
A P R I L	14	Ultra	Depeche Mode	-
A P R I L	15	Adriana Evans	Adriana Evans	-
A P R I L	15	All Star United	All Star United	-
A P R I L	15	Austin Powers (Original Soundtrack)	Various Artists	Soundtrack
A P R I L	15	Blue Pony	Julie Miller	-
A P R I L	15	Blues for the Lost Days	John Mayall & the Bluesbreakers	-
A P R I L	15	Burnin' Daylight	Burnin' Daylight	-
A P R I L	15	Dominion	Kamelot	-
A P R I L	15	Elegantly Wasted	INXS	Final album with Michael Hutchence on lead vocals
A P R I L	15	Free Mars	Lusk	Debut
A P R I L	15	Glee	Bran Van 3000	Debut
A P R I L	15	In the Mirror	Yanni	Compilation
A P R I L	15	Rome	Rome	-
A P R I L	15	Romy and Michele's High School Reunion (Original Soundtrack)	Various Artists	Soundtrack
A P R I L	15	Savage Garden	Savage Garden	US, Debut
A P R I L	15	Secret Robot Control	Baboon	-
A P R I L	15	Sevendust	Sevendust	Debut
A P R I L	15	Shadowlife	Dokken	-
A P R I L	15	Six Days on the Road	Sawyer Brown	-
A P R I L	15	That's Them	Artifacts	-
A P R I L	15	TMOTD	Scar Tissue	-
A P R I L	15	Twenty-Eight Teeth	Buck-O-Nine	-
A P R I L	15	White Stones	Secret Garden	-
A P R I L	15	You and I	Teddy Pendergrass	-
A P R I L	15	You Betta' Move Somethin'!	Huck-A-Bucks	-
A P R I L	16	Travma	Anna Vissi	-
A P R I L	17	Ten Rapid (Collected Recordings 1996–1997)	Mogwai	Compilation
A P R I L	18	Anclado En Mi Corazón	Anahí	-
A P R I L	18	Lifter Puller	Lifter Puller	-
A P R I L	18	Spoonful - Tales Begin to Spin	Will Hoge	-
A P R I L	20	For Monkeys	Millencolin	Sweden; US release date 20 May
A P R I L	21	Ashtrayhead	Ashtrayhead	-
A P R I L	21	In It for the Money	Supergrass	-
A P R I L	21	The Mind's I	Dark Tranquillity	-
A P R I L	21	Tellin' Stories	The Charlatans	-
A P R I L	22	Back from the Dead	Obituary	-
A P R I L	22	Bekka & Billy	Bekka & Billy	
A P R I L	22	Carrying Your Love with Me	George Strait	-
A P R I L	22	Full Circle	Pennywise	-
A P R I L	22	I Can Hear the Heart Beating as One	Yo La Tengo	-
A P R I L	22	Karma	Delerium	-
A P R I L	22	Living in Clip	Ani DiFranco	Live
A P R I L	22	Monsoon	Caroline's Spine	-
A P R I L	22	A Pleasant Shade of Gray	Fates Warning	-
A P R I L	22	Share My World	Mary J. Blige	-
A P R I L	22	Silencio=Muerte: Red Hot + Latin	Various Artists	Red Hot Benefit series
A P R I L	22	Sound of Lies	The Jayhawks	-
A P R I L	22	Straightaways	Son Volt	-
A P R I L	22	Tu-Plang	Regurgitator	US
A P R I L	22	Waterbed Hev	Heavy D	-
A P R I L	27	Through Times of War	Keep of Kalessin	-
A P R I L	28	Blackrock (Original Soundtrack)	Various Artists	Australia, Soundtrack
A P R I L	28	Hard Normal Daddy	Squarepusher	-
A P R I L	28	It's Me God	Breach	-
A P R I L	28	Visions	Stratovarius	-
A P R I L	29	Anywhere But Here	The Ataris	-
A P R I L	29	Cheap Trick	Cheap Trick	-
A P R I L	29	Dare to Be Surprised	The Folk Implosion	-
A P R I L	29	Kill Fuck Die	W.A.S.P.	-
A P R I L	29	Picnic	Robert Earl Keen	-
A P R I L	29	Port of Mystery	Yanni	Compilation
A P R I L	29	Shaming of the Sun	Indigo Girls	-
A P R I L	29	Tammy Graham	Tammy Graham	-
A P R I L	29	Twenty	Lynyrd Skynyrd	-
A P R I L	30	The Lost World: Jurassic Park (Original Motion Picture Score)	John Williams	Soundtrack
A P R I L	30	UnMerry Melodies	Bigwig	-
A P R I L	?	One More Megabyte	The Toy Dolls	-
M A Y	1	Ed Mort	Arrigo Barnabé	Brazil, Soundtrack
M A Y	1	Juicy Planet Earth	Flapjack	Poland
M A Y	5	Baile de Los Locos	Voodoo Glow Skulls	-
M A Y	5	Concrete Blonde y Los Illegals	Concrete Blonde	-
M A Y	5	Double Clutch	Andrew Cyrille and Richard Teitelbaum	Live
M A Y	5	Flaming Pie	Paul McCartney	-
M A Y	5	Honky	Melvins	-
M A Y	5	Sweet Potato Pie	Robert Cray	-
M A Y	6	Allure	Allure	-
M A Y	6	Blurring the Edges	Meredith Brooks	-
M A Y	6	Middle of Nowhere	Hanson	-
M A Y	6	Retrospective I	Rush	Compilation
M A Y	6	Return to Paradise	Styx	Live
M A Y	6	What My Heart Already Knows	Julian Austin	-
M A Y	12	Halim	Natacha Atlas	-
M A Y	12	Roofers	Breaks Co-Op	-
M A Y	13	American Psycho	Misfits	-
M A Y	13	Butterfly Kisses (Shades of Grace)	Bob Carlisle	-
M A Y	13	The Fruit That Ate Itself	Modest Mouse	EP
M A Y	13	Get Some	Snot	Debut
M A Y	13	I'm Bout It	Various Artists	Soundtrack
M A Y	13	Lee Ann Womack	Lee Ann Womack	Debut
M A Y	13	Pure Chewing Satisfaction	Lard	-
M A Y	13	Quality Soft Core	Mad Caddies	-
M A Y	13	Soulful Fruit	Rob Swift	-
M A Y	13	Terror & Magnificence	Elvis Costello and John Harle	-
M A Y	15	Liquid White Light	Poi Dog Pondering	Live'
M A Y	19	Polythene	Feeder	-
M A Y	19	Dark Fields	Show of Hands	-
M A Y	20	Blessid Union of Souls	Blessid Union of Souls	-
M A Y	20	Blood on the Dance Floor: HIStory in the Mix	Michael Jackson	Remix/New
M A Y	20	Blue Moon Swamp	John Fogerty	-
M A Y	20	Blues Brothers & Friends: Live from House of Blues	The Blues Brothers	Live
M A Y	20	Bruiser Queen	Cake Like	-
M A Y	20	Coil	Toad the Wet Sprocket	-
M A Y	20	The Colour and the Shape	Foo Fighters	-
M A Y	20	For the People	Boot Camp Clik	Debut
M A Y	20	Happy Birthday to Me	The Muffs	-
M A Y	20	Hourglass	James Taylor	-
M A Y	20	I Got Next	KRS-One	-
M A Y	20	Mag Earwhig!	Guided by Voices	-
M A Y	20	Marching to Mars	Sammy Hagar	-
M A Y	20	Play	Great Big Sea	-
M A Y	20	Red Apple Falls	Smog	-
M A Y	20	Remanufacture – Cloning Technology	Fear Factory	Remix
M A Y	20	Something to Remember Me By	Ben Lee	-
M A Y	20	Standing in My Shoes	Leo Kottke	-
M A Y	20	You're the Inspiration: A Collection	Peter Cetera	Compilation
M A Y	20	Zuckerbaby	Zuckerbaby	Canada, Debut
M A Y	21	OK Computer	Radiohead	Japan; UK release date 16 June
M A Y	26	Direction Reaction Creation	The Jam	Compilation
M A Y	26	Do It Yourself	The Seahorses	-
M A Y	26	NSYNC	NSYNC	Germany
M A Y	26	Tumuli Shroomaroom	Acrimony	-
M A Y	27	Across America	Art Garfunkel	Live
M A Y	30	Enthrone Darkness Triumphant	Dimmu Borgir	-
M A Y	30	Princessa	Princessa	International release of her Spanish album Calling You
M A Y	?	Curious Corn	Ozric Tentacles	UK
M A Y	?	Karma Cleansing	Harem Scarem	-
M A Y	?	Penetrations from the Lost World	Dimension Zero	EP
M A Y	?	Raygun	Matthew Good Band	Canada, EP
M A Y	?	The Stereo Bus	The Stereo Bus	New Zealand, Debut
J U N E	2	Dark Days in Paradise	Gary Moore	-
J U N E	2	Timeless	Sarah Brightman	-
J U N E	3	Accident of Birth	Bruce Dickinson	-
J U N E	3	Album of the Year	Faith No More	-
J U N E	3	Big Notebook For Easy Piano	Fluid Ounces	Debut
J U N E	3	Blood Rooted	Sepultura	Compilation
J U N E	3	Creature	Moist	Album
J U N E	3	Days of the New	Days of the New	Debut
J U N E	3	Fun and Games	The Huntingtons	-
J U N E	3	G3: Live in Concert	Joe Satriani, Steve Vai and Eric Johnson	Live
J U N E	3	Gospel Oak	Sinéad O'Connor	EP
J U N E	3	Greatest Hits	Boston	Compilation +3 new tracks
J U N E	3	Innamorata	Pat Benatar	-
J U N E	3	Inside the Torn Apart	Napalm Death	-
J U N E	3	Jet	Katell Keineg	-
J U N E	3	Junction Seven	Steve Winwood	-
J U N E	3	One for the Road	Kevin Fowler	-
J U N E	3	Prime Cuts	Suicidal Tendencies	Compilation
J U N E	3	Resigned	Michael Penn	
J U N E	3	Retrospective II	Rush	Compilation
J U N E	3	RockCrown	Seven Mary Three	-
J U N E	3	Songs from a Parent to a Child	Art Garfunkel	-
J U N E	3	Under These Rocks and Stones	Chantal Kreviazuk	US
J U N E	3	Wu-Tang Forever	Wu-Tang Clan	-
J U N E	4	Clodhopper	Glueleg	Canada
J U N E	6	Days of Purgatory	Iced Earth	Remix
J U N E	6	Lucy	Taeko Onuki	Japan
J U N E	6	Nighttime Birds	The Gathering	-
J U N E	6	A Portable Model Of...	Joan of Arc	Debut
J U N E	9	Music for Pleasure	Monaco	-
J U N E	10	1212	Barbara Manning	-
J U N E	10	Batman & Robin	Various Artists	Soundtrack
J U N E	10	A Crime for All Seasons	My Life with the Thrill Kill Kult	-
J U N E	10	Dream with the Fishes Soundtrack	Various Artists	Soundtrack
J U N E	10	Drag	k.d. lang	Covers album
J U N E	10	Full Force Galesburg	The Mountain Goats	-
J U N E	10	Pushing the Salmanilla Envelope	Jimmie's Chicken Shack	-
J U N E	10	SYR1: Anagrama	Sonic Youth	EP
J U N E	10	Vibrolush	Vibrolush	Debut
J U N E	16	Ladies and Gentlemen We Are Floating in Space	Spiritualized	-
J U N E	16	Destination Anywhere	Jon Bon Jovi	-
J U N E	17	Body Language	Jonathan Cain	-
J U N E	17	Con Air	Mark Mancina and Trevor Rabin	Soundtrack
J U N E	17	Crazy Nights	Lonestar	-
J U N E	17	Cryptic Writings	Megadeth	-
J U N E	17	Declaration of Conformity	Wellwater Conspiracy	-
J U N E	17	The Devil You Know	Econoline Crush	Canada
J U N E	17	Do It Yourself	The Seahorses	-
J U N E	17	Dude Ranch	Blink-182	-
J U N E	17	Egyptology	World Party	-
J U N E	17	EV3	En Vogue	-
J U N E	17	Feelings	David Byrne	-
J U N E	17	Ghostyhead	Rickie Lee Jones	-
J U N E	17	The Legend of Chin	Switchfoot	Debut
J U N E	17	Love Always	K-Ci & JoJo	-
J U N E	17	Love Among the Ruins	10,000 Maniacs	-
J U N E	17	Love, Peace & Nappiness	Lost Boyz	-
J U N E	17	My Best Friend's Wedding (Music from the Motion Picture)	Various Artists	Soundtrack
J U N E	17	Now	Paul Rodgers	-
J U N E	17	Now Playing	Chopper One	Debut
J U N E	17	Other Songs	Ron Sexsmith	-
J U N E	17	Paradisiaque	MC Solaar	-
J U N E	17	Psycho's Path	John Lydon	-
J U N E	17	Pure Juice	Summercamp	Debut
J U N E	17	Resolution	38 Special	-
J U N E	17	Too Far to Care	Old 97's	-
J U N E	17	The Very Best of 10cc	10cc	Compilation
J U N E	17	The War Report	Capone-N-Noreaga	-
J U N E	17	We've Been Had Again	Huffamoose	-
J U N E	17	The Will to Live	Ben Harper	-
J U N E	17	Year of the Horse	Neil Young & Crazy Horse	Live
J U N E	21	Happy End of the World	Pizzicato Five	Japan
J U N E	23	Heavy Soul	Paul Weller	-
J U N E	23	New Forms	Roni Size & Reprazent	Debut
J U N E	24	Adrenaline Rush	Twista	-
J U N E	24	Candy Toy Guns and Television	20 Dead Flower Children	-
J U N E	24	The Carnival	Wyclef Jean	-
J U N E	24	Curtains	Tindersticks	-
J U N E	24	Da Dirty 30	Cru	-
J U N E	24	Demonic	Testament	-
J U N E	24	Floored	Sugar Ray	-
J U N E	24	Flying Away	Smoke City	Debut
J U N E	24	Fly Stereophonic	Lida Husik	-
J U N E	24	Generation Swine	Mötley Crüe	-
J U N E	24	Glory to the Brave	HammerFall	-
J U N E	24	The Great Milenko	Insane Clown Posse	-
J U N E	24	Hipnosis	Shootyz Groove	-
J U N E	24	Interiors	Brad	-
J U N E	24	Let Me Play With Your Poodle	Marcia Ball	-
J U N E	24	Misguided Roses	Edwin McCain	-
J U N E	24	The Mollusk	Ween	-
J U N E	24	Morningrise	Opeth	US
J U N E	24	Operation: Get Down	Craig Mack	Sophomore
J U N E	24	Pristine Smut	The Murmurs	-
J U N E	24	Rusty	Slick Shoes	-
J U N E	24	Some Other Sucker's Parade	Del Amitri	-
J U N E	24	Stuff	Holly McNarland	Canada, Debut
J U N E	30	The Fat of the Land	The Prodigy	-
J U N E	30	Guns in the Ghetto	UB40	-
J U N E	30	Iron Savior	Iron Savior	-
J U N E	30	Lunatic Harness	μ-Ziq	UK
J U N E	30	Spiritech	Alchemist	-
J U N E	?	Envy of Angels	The Mutton Birds	UK
J U N E	?	It's My Life – The Album	Sash!	-
J U N E	?	Two Feet Stand	Gardenian	-

=== July – September ===
Date		Album	Artist	Notes
J U L Y	1	3/5	Les Savy Fav	Debut
J U L Y	1	The A Files	Sham 69	-
J U L Y	1	Keep Your Receipt	Reel Big Fish	EP
J U L Y	1	Love Is a Dog from Hell	Maggie Estep	-
J U L Y	1	Men in Black: The Album	Various Artists	Soundtrack
J U L Y	1	Straight on Till Morning	Blues Traveler	-
J U L Y	1	Three Dollar Bill, Yall	Limp Bizkit	Debut
J U L Y	1	Zoot Suit Riot	Cherry Poppin' Daddies	Compilation
J U L Y	3	Equalizeher	Baby Vox	South Korea, Debut
J U L Y	4	Santa Rita de Sampa	Rita Lee	
J U L Y	4	The Collection 1982–1988	Celine Dion	EU Compilation
J U L Y	7	Boys on the Docks	Dropkick Murphys	EP
J U L Y	7	The Drop	Brian Eno	-
J U L Y	7	Ghetto Machine	Loudness	-
J U L Y	7	Thylacine	Monique Brumby	Australia, Debut
J U L Y	7	Vanishing Point	Primal Scream	-
J U L Y	8	Another Lesson in Violence	Exodus	Live
J U L Y	8	Anthems to the Welkin at Dusk	Emperor	-
J U L Y	8	Bound, Gagged and Blindfolded	Skinlab	Debut
J U L Y	8	Brown Album	Primus	-
J U L Y	8	Fush Yu Mang	Smash Mouth	Debut
J U L Y	8	The Uneventful Vacation	Commander Venus	-
J U L Y	8	Via Satellite	Super Deluxe	
J U L Y	11	Progressive Attack 6	Various Artists	Compilation
J U L Y	14	Drive	Bic Runga	New Zealand
J U L Y	14	Evergreen	Echo & the Bunnymen	-
J U L Y	14	Now That's What I Call Music! 37 (UK series)	Various Artists	Compilation
J U L Y	14	One Second	Paradise Lost	-
J U L Y	15	Cherry Peel	of Montreal	Debut
J U L Y	15	...The Dandy Warhols Come Down	The Dandy Warhols	-
J U L Y	15	Deadly Sting: The Mercury Years	Scorpions	Compilation + 2 new tracks (US version)
J U L Y	15	End of the Summer	Dar Williams	-
J U L Y	15	Home Grown	Blue Mountain	-
J U L Y	15	I Will Stand	Kenny Chesney	-
J U L Y	15	Metropolis	Sister Machine Gun	-
J U L Y	15	MTV Unplugged	Maxwell	Live
J U L Y	15	Musical Monkey	Guttermouth	-
J U L Y	15	Supa Dupa Fly	Missy "Misdemeanor" Elliott	-
J U L Y	15	Surfacing	Sarah McLachlan	-
J U L Y	15	Tremolo	Blue Rodeo	-
J U L Y	15	Under the Covers	Dwight Yoakam	Covers album
J U L Y	21	Ocean Machine: Biomech	Devin Townsend	-
J U L Y	22	Breed	Lauren Christy	-
J U L Y	22	Elemental Soul	Marlena Shaw	-
J U L Y	22	No Way Out	Puff Daddy and the Bad Boy Family	-
J U L Y	22	Outcast	Kreator	-
J U L Y	22	Funcrusher Plus	Company Flow	Debut
J U L Y	22	Collage	Ratt	Compilation
J U L Y	24	Concentration 20	Namie Amuro	-
J U L Y	24	Uchū Nippon Setagaya	Fishmans	-
J U L Y	29	Adam and Eve	Catherine Wheel	-
J U L Y	29	All That I Am	Joe	-
J U L Y	29	Angry Fist	Hi-Standard	-
J U L Y	29	The Art of War	Bone Thugs-n-Harmony	-
J U L Y	29	Dispepsi	Negativland	-
J U L Y	29	98 Degrees	98 Degrees	Debut
J U L Y	29	A Fistful of Alice	Alice Cooper	Live
J U L Y	29	Give 'Em the Boot	Various Artists	Compilation
J U L Y	29	How Ace Are Buildings	A	-
J U L Y	29	The Last Time I Committed Suicide	Various Artists	Soundtrack
J U L Y	29	Nothin' but the Taillights	Clint Black	-
J U L Y	29	Official Live: 101 Proof	Pantera	Live
J U L Y	29	Pup Tent	Luna	-
J U L Y	29	Shrinking the Blob	Oleander	-
J U L Y	29	Size 14	Size 14	Debut
J U L Y	29	Songs from Northern Britain	Teenage Fanclub	-
J U L Y	29	Spawn: The Album	Various Artists	Soundtrack
J U L Y	29	Star Maps: Original Motion Picture Soundtrack	Various Artists	Soundtrack
J U L Y	29	Strangers Almanac	Whiskeytown	-
J U L Y	29	The Virginian	Neko Case	Debut
J U L Y	29	Where Have All the Merrymakers Gone?	Harvey Danger	Debut
J U L Y	?	Fabulosos Calavera	Los Fabulosos Cadillacs	-
A U G U S T	4	Forever Alien	Spectrum	-
A U G U S T	5	Chance and Circumstance	Neal Coty	-
A U G U S T	5	How to be a Player	Various Artists	Soundtrack
A U G U S T	5	Overcast!	Atmosphere	Debut
A U G U S T	5	Silent Weapons for Quiet Wars	Killarmy	-
A U G U S T	5	Buster's Spanish Rocketship	Buster Poindexter	-
A U G U S T	5	Transistor	311	-
A U G U S T	7	Fantasma	Cornelius	-
A U G U S T	6	Irāvatī	Megumi Hayashibara	Japan
A U G U S T	6	Maverick a Strike	Finley Quaye	Debut
A U G U S T	11	Maladjusted	Morrissey	-
A U G U S T	11	Backstreet's Back	Backstreet Boys	-
A U G U S T	12	24 Hours a Day	The Bottle Rockets	-
A U G U S T	12	A Deeper Kind of Slumber	Tiamat	-
A U G U S T	12	Double Plaidinum	Lagwagon	-
A U G U S T	12	Gun Shy, Trigger Happy	Jennifer Trynin	-
A U G U S T	12	Hed PE	Hed PE	Debut
A U G U S T	12	No Holds Barred	Biohazard	-
A U G U S T	12	Phobos	Voivod	-
A U G U S T	12	Release Some Tension	SWV	-
A U G U S T	12	Romances	Luis Miguel	-
A U G U S T	12	Shakin' Things Up	Lorrie Morgan	-
A U G U S T	12	Souls on Ice	Seagram	-
A U G U S T	12	Spoke	Calexico	-
A U G U S T	12	Womblife	John Fahey	-
A U G U S T	14	F♯A♯∞	Godspeed You Black Emperor!	-
A U G U S T	15	Black-Ash Inheritance	In Flames	EP
A U G U S T	18	Already	Jesus Jones	-
A U G U S T	18	Autoditacker	Mouse on Mars	-
A U G U S T	18	In Deep	Tina Arena	-
A U G U S T	18	MiLight	DJ Krush	International
A U G U S T	19	Absolutely No Alternative	Anvil	-
A U G U S T	19	The Fourth World	Kara's Flowers	Became Maroon 5
A U G U S T	19	The Dance	Fleetwood Mac	Live
A U G U S T	19	Daisy	Dog's Eye View	-
A U G U S T	19	Jewelz	O.C.	-
A U G U S T	19	Lip Service	Tom Grant	-
A U G U S T	19	Making Friends	No Use for a Name	-
A U G U S T	19	Money Talks: The Album	Various Artists	Soundtrack
A U G U S T	19	Transmission	The Tea Party	-
A U G U S T	21	Be Here Now	Oasis	-
A U G U S T	22	Sehnsucht	Rammstein	-
A U G U S T	25	Age of Love	Scooter	Germany
A U G U S T	25	Word Gets Around	Stereophonics	-
A U G U S T	25	Somewhere Out in Space	Gamma Ray	-
A U G U S T	25	Bad Timing	Jim O'Rourke	-
A U G U S T	25	Ghosts	Wendy Matthews	Australia
A U G U S T	25	Latyrx	Latyrx	-
A U G U S T	25	Radiator	Super Furry Animals	-
A U G U S T	26	¿Dónde Jugarán las Niñas?	Molotov	Mexico
A U G U S T	26	Boom! Boom! Boom!	The Kelley Deal 6000	-
A U G U S T	26	Conspiracy No. 5	Third Day	-
A U G U S T	26	Devotion: The Best of Yanni	Yanni	Compilation
A U G U S T	26	Evolution	Martina McBride	-
A U G U S T	26	The First Session	Hole	EP
A U G U S T	26	Fresh Meat	Arkarna	-
A U G U S T	26	Likwidation	Tha Alkaholiks	-
A U G U S T	26	Last of the Sharpshooters	Down by Law	-
A U G U S T	26	Love Scenes	Diana Krall	-
A U G U S T	26	Midnite Lover	Shaggy	-
A U G U S T	26	My Soul	Coolio	-
A U G U S T	26	Raybon Brothers	Raybon Brothers	-
A U G U S T	26	Saliva	Saliva	Debut
A U G U S T	26	Singles 1–12	Melvins	Compilation
A U G U S T	26	(Songbook) A Collection of Hits	Trisha Yearwood	Compilation
A U G U S T	26	Smile from the Streets You Hold	John Frusciante	-
A U G U S T	26	Sweet 75	Sweet 75	-
A U G U S T	26	That's What Daddy Wants	Wayne Hancock	-
A U G U S T	26	Tip	Finger Eleven	Canada
A U G U S T	26	Trysome Eatone	Love Spit Love	-
A U G U S T	26	Vegas	The Crystal Method	-
A U G U S T	26	Welcome to the Freak Show	dc Talk	Live
A U G U S T	28	Moonflower Plastic	Tobin Sprout	-
A U G U S T	?	A Day in the Life	Jane Siberry	Canada
S E P T E M B E R	1	Bajeczki	Patrycja Kosiarkiewicz	Poland
S E P T E M B E R	1	Bang Bang	Dispatch	-
S E P T E M B E R	1	Calling All Stations	Genesis	-
S E P T E M B E R	1	Way Out West	Way Out West	-
S E P T E M B E R	1	Tubthumper	Chumbawamba	-
S E P T E M B E R	1	Makaa Maka	Reggie Rockstone	Debut
S E P T E M B E R	1	Monkey vs Robot	James Kochalka Superstar	-
S E P T E M B E R	2	Despite Yourself	Headswim	-
S E P T E M B E R	2	Ghetto D	Master P	-
S E P T E M B E R	2	Heaven and Hell	Joe Jackson	-
S E P T E M B E R	2	Indoor Living	Superchunk	-
S E P T E M B E R	2	SYR2: Slaapkamers met slagroom	Sonic Youth	EP
S E P T E M B E R	2	Talk Show	Talk Show	Debut, Stone Temple Pilots side project
S E P T E M B E R	3	Abrasive	Puddle of Mudd	-
S E P T E M B E R	3	Clover	Shikao Suga	-
S E P T E M B E R	8	Good Feeling	Travis	UK
S E P T E M B E R	8	Girl	Dannii Minogue	-
S E P T E M B E R	8	Let's Get Killed	David Holmes	-
S E P T E M B E R	8	Slightly Odway	Jebediah	Australia, Debut
S E P T E M B E R	8	Chrome Matrix	Superheist	Australia, EP
S E P T E M B E R	8	When I Was Born for the 7th Time	Cornershop	-
S E P T E M B E R	9	Behind the Eyes	Amy Grant	-
S E P T E M B E R	9	Fire Down Below (Music from the Motion Picture)	Various Artists	Soundtrack
S E P T E M B E R	9	Forest for the Trees	Forest for the Trees	Debut
S E P T E M B E R	9	Full Blown Possession	Grifters	-
S E P T E M B E R	9	Hang-Ups	Goldfinger	-
S E P T E M B E R	9	It Means Everything	Save Ferris	-
S E P T E M B E R	9	Let Me In	Chely Wright	-
S E P T E M B E R	9	The Magic City	Helium	-
S E P T E M B E R	9	Más	Alejandro Sanz	-
S E P T E M B E R	9	Modus Operandi	Photek	-
S E P T E M B E R	9	Moon Hut	Kim Fox	Debut
S E P T E M B E R	9	The Peacemaker: Original Motion Picture Soundtrack	Hans Zimmer	Soundtrack
S E P T E M B E R	9	Re-Animation Festival	Groovie Ghoulies	
S E P T E M B E R	9	Samantha Cole	Samantha Cole	Debut
S E P T E M B E R	9	S.C.I.E.N.C.E.	Incubus	-
S E P T E M B E R	9	Such Blinding Stars for Starving Eyes	Cursive	-
S E P T E M B E R	9	Total Madness – The Very Best of Madness	Madness	US Compilation
S E P T E M B E R	9	Troublizing	Ric Ocasek	-
S E P T E M B E R	9	You Light Up My Life: Inspirational Songs	LeAnn Rimes	-
S E P T E M B E R	9	Lovesongs for Underdogs	Tanya Donelly	Debut
S E P T E M B E R	10	Second Solution / Prisoner of Society	The Living End	Biggest selling EP of the 1990s in Australia
S E P T E M B E R	11	Butterfly	Mariah Carey	UK; US release date 16 September
S E P T E M B E R	15	Marchin' Already	Ocean Colour Scene	-
S E P T E M B E R	15	We Have the Technology	Custard	Australia
S E P T E M B E R	16	Based on a True Story	Mack 10	-
S E P T E M B E R	16	Bread and Jam for Frances	Switchblade Symphony	-
S E P T E M B E R	16	The Bottle & Fresh Horses	The Refreshments	-
S E P T E M B E R	16	Buena Vista Social Club	Buena Vista Social Club	-
S E P T E M B E R	16	Film Noir	Carly Simon	-
S E P T E M B E R	16	The Greatest Hits Collection	Brooks & Dunn	Compilation
S E P T E M B E R	16	Guide to Better Living	Grinspoon	Australia, Debut
S E P T E M B E R	16	Much Afraid	Jars of Clay	-
S E P T E M B E R	16	Music from the Soul Food Motion Picture	Various Artists	Soundtrack
S E P T E M B E R	16	My Way	Usher	-
S E P T E M B E R	16	Rated X Mas	Matt Rogers	Christmas
S E P T E M B E R	16	When Disaster Strikes...	Busta Rhymes	-
S E P T E M B E R	17	Marigold Sky	Hall & Oates	-
S E P T E M B E R	18	El Gran Orgo	At the Drive-In	EP
S E P T E M B E R	21	Four the Hard Way	Danger Danger	Japanese release date
S E P T E M B E R	22	Barely Legal	The Hives	-
S E P T E M B E R	22	Boas Notícias	Xuxa	Brazil
S E P T E M B E R	22	ESCM	BT	-
S E P T E M B E R	22	Homogenic	Björk	
S E P T E M B E R	22	Dots and Loops	Stereolab	-
S E P T E M B E R	22	Static & Silence	The Sundays	-
S E P T E M B E R	22	The Big Picture	Elton John	-
S E P T E M B E R	22	The Hollowing	Crisis	-
S E P T E M B E R	23	An American Werewolf in Paris (Music from the Motion Picture)	Various Artists	Soundtrack
S E P T E M B E R	23	Anytime	Brian McKnight	-
S E P T E M B E R	23	Back in Business	EPMD	-
S E P T E M B E R	23	Blame It on Me	Alana Davis	Debut
S E P T E M B E R	23	The Bouncing Souls	The Bouncing Souls	-
S E P T E M B E R	23	B-Sides and Otherwise	Morphine	Compilation
S E P T E M B E R	23	December Makes Me Feel This Way	Dave Koz	-
S E P T E M B E R	23	The Epiphany of Glenn Jones	Cul de Sac and John Fahey	-
S E P T E M B E R	23	Evolution	Boyz II Men	-
S E P T E M B E R	23	Falling into Infinity	Dream Theater	-
S E P T E M B E R	23	Gone From Danger	Joan Baez	-
S E P T E M B E R	23	The Hangover	Gilby Clarke	-
S E P T E M B E R	23	Happy?	Jann Arden	-
S E P T E M B E R	23	In Your Bright Ray	Grant McLennan	-
S E P T E M B E R	23	Man & His Music (Remixes from Around the World)	Boogie Down Productions	Remix
S E P T E M B E R	23	Me Estoy Enamorando	Alejandro Fernández	-
S E P T E M B E R	23	The Next Voice You Hear: The Best of Jackson Browne	Jackson Browne	Compilation
S E P T E M B E R	23	Novelty Forever	Bracket	-
S E P T E M B E R	23	Romanza	Andrea Bocelli	-
S E P T E M B E R	23	Sentimental Education	Free Kitten	-
S E P T E M B E R	23	Sit Stand Kneel Prey	Whiplash	-
S E P T E M B E R	23	Shapes	Polvo	-
S E P T E M B E R	23	Songs of a Circling Spirit	Tom Cochrane	Compilation
S E P T E M B E R	23	Sounds of the Animal Kingdom	Brutal Truth	-
S E P T E M B E R	23	A Very Special Christmas 3	Various Artists	Christmas
S E P T E M B E R	26	Ma-KING	Masami Okui	Japan
S E P T E M B E R	26	Shleep	Robert Wyatt	-
S E P T E M B E R	29	Bridges to Babylon	The Rolling Stones	-
S E P T E M B E R	29	Portishead	Portishead	-
S E P T E M B E R	29	Levitate	The Fall	-
S E P T E M B E R	29	Life thru a Lens	Robbie Williams	-
S E P T E M B E R	29	Meet the Family	Frenzal Rhomb	-
S E P T E M B E R	29	Paul McCartney's Standing Stone	Paul McCartney	-
S E P T E M B E R	29	The Promised	Simple Minds	Compilation
S E P T E M B E R	29	Relief Through Release	Tura Satana	-
S E P T E M B E R	29	Symbols	KMFDM	-
S E P T E M B E R	29	Urban Hymns	The Verve	-
S E P T E M B E R	29	With a Twist	Todd Rundgren	-
S E P T E M B E R	30	The Book of Secrets	Loreena McKennitt	-
S E P T E M B E R	30	E-lux	Human Waste Project	Debut
S E P T E M B E R	30	Four Minute Mile	The Get Up Kids	-
S E P T E M B E R	30	Hunger	Janis Ian	-
S E P T E M B E R	30	I'm Your Man	Jason Sellers	-
S E P T E M B E R	30	Lo Mejor de Mí	Cristian Castro	-
S E P T E M B E R	30	Long Stretch of Lonesome	Patty Loveless	-
S E P T E M B E R	30	100 Million Eyeballs	Miss Angie	Debut
S E P T E M B E R	30	One Day It'll All Make Sense	Common	-
S E P T E M B E R	30	Peace and Noise	Patti Smith	-
S E P T E M B E R	30	The Edge: Original Motion Picture Soundtrack	Jerry Goldsmith	Soundtrack
S E P T E M B E R	30	Time Out of Mind	Bob Dylan	-
S E P T E M B E R	30	Tone Soul Evolution	The Apples in Stereo	-
S E P T E M B E R	30	Think Like a Girl	Diana King	-
S E P T E M B E R	30	Weights and Measures	Spirit of the West	-
S E P T E M B E R	?	King Without a Clue	Mark Seymour	Australia, Debut

=== October – December ===
Date		Album	Artist	Notes
O C T O B E R	1	Blutsabbath	Belphegor	-
O C T O B E R	1	Payin' the Dues	The Hellacopters	-
O C T O B E R	1	Shadows in the Banquet Hall	Carbon Leaf	-
O C T O B E R	6	21st Century Fox	Samantha Fox	-
O C T O B E R	6	Apartment Life	Ivy	-
O C T O B E R	6	Come to Daddy	Aphex Twin	EP
O C T O B E R	6	Contemplating the Engine Room	Mike Watt	-
O C T O B E R	6	Death to the Pixies	Pixies	Compilation
O C T O B E R	6	Laugh	Terry Hall	-
O C T O B E R	6	Milk and Blood	Jim Martin	Europe
O C T O B E R	6	Proud Like a God	Guano Apes	Germany
O C T O B E R	7	60 Cycle Hum	Pulley	-
O C T O B E R	7	The Day the Sun Went Out	Boysetsfire	-
O C T O B E R	7	A Dead Poem	Rotting Christ	-
O C T O B E R	7	El Corazón	Steve Earle	-
O C T O B E R	7	Give It Back!	The Brian Jonestown Massacre	-
O C T O B E R	7	In Loving Memory Of...	Big Wreck	-
O C T O B E R	7	More Best of Leonard Cohen	Leonard Cohen	Compilation
O C T O B E R	7	So Much for the Afterglow	Everclear	-
O C T O B E R	7	South Saturn Delta	Jimi Hendrix	Compilation
O C T O B E R	7	Thicker Than Water	H^{2}O	-
O C T O B E R	7	Trouble Is...	Kenny Wayne Shepherd	-
O C T O B E R	7	Underdogs	Matthew Good Band	Canada
O C T O B E R	7	The Velvet Rope	Janet Jackson	-
O C T O B E R	7	Willis	The Pietasters	-
O C T O B E R	7	Wolf Songs for Lambs	Jonathan Fire*Eater	-
O C T O B E R	8	National Steel	Colin James	-
O C T O B E R	10	blackmail	blackmail	-
O C T O B E R	10	The Fantastic Plastic Machine	Fantastic Plastic Machine	-
O C T O B E R	10	I Know What You Did Last Summer: The Album	Various Artists	Soundtrack
O C T O B E R	10	I Like to Score	Moby	Compilation
O C T O B E R	10	Review	Glay	Compilation
O C T O B E R	13	20,000 Watt R.S.L.	Midnight Oil	Compilation
O C T O B E R	13	Instrumentals	Mouse on Mars	-
O C T O B E R	13	Jurassic 5	Jurassic 5	EP
O C T O B E R	13	Pleased to Meet You	Sleeper	-
O C T O B E R	13	Quarashi	Quarashi	Iceland, Debut
O C T O B E R	14	Dauði Baldrs	Burzum	Norway
O C T O B E R	14	Omnio	In the Woods...	-
O C T O B E R	14	Medazzaland	Duran Duran	-
O C T O B E R	14	Nimrod	Green Day	-
O C T O B E R	14	Nothing Feels Good	The Promise Ring	-
O C T O B E R	14	Phenomenon	LL Cool J	-
O C T O B E R	14	The Pick, the Sickle and the Shovel	Gravediggaz	-
O C T O B E R	14	Switchback: Songs from the Soundtrack	Various Artists	Soundtrack
O C T O B E R	14	Unleash the Beast	Saxon	-
O C T O B E R	14	Urban Rapsody	Rick James	-
O C T O B E R	20	Coma Divine – Recorded Live in Rome	Porcupine Tree	Live
O C T O B E R	20	Freek Funk	Luke Slater	-
O C T O B E R	20	Exile	Gary Numan	UK
O C T O B E R	21	A Jagged Era	Jagged Edge	-
O C T O B E R	21	Nas, Foxy Brown, AZ, and Nature Present The Firm: The Album	The Firm (Nas, Foxy Brown, AZ, and Nature)	-
O C T O B E R	21	Brand New	Salt-n-Pepa	-
O C T O B E R	21	Cattlemen Don't	Triplefastaction	
O C T O B E R	21	Extreme Honey	Elvis Costello	Compilation
O C T O B E R	21	Kashmir: Symphonic Led Zeppelin	Jaz Coleman and The London Philharmonic Orchestra	-
O C T O B E R	21	Gattaca	Michael Nyman	Soundtrack
O C T O B E R	21	Get Crunk, Who U Wit: Da Album	Lil Jon & the Eastside Boyz	-
O C T O B E R	21	Getting Past the Static	Jen Wood	
O C T O B E R	21	Go!	Letters to Cleo	-
O C T O B E R	21	Half Dead and Dynamite	Lifter Puller	-
O C T O B E R	21	Under the Western Freeway	Grandaddy	-
O C T O B E R	21	I Never Even Asked for Light	Lullaby for the Working Class	-
O C T O B E R	21	Joya	Will Oldham	-
O C T O B E R	21	The Other Side	Wynonna Judd	-
O C T O B E R	21	Phoenix Rising	Artension	-
O C T O B E R	21	The Remixes	Shakira	Remix
O C T O B E R	21	Serpents of the Light	Deicide	-
O C T O B E R	21	So Long and Thanks for All the Shoes	NOFX	-
O C T O B E R	21	Transister	Transister	Debut
O C T O B E R	21	Young Team	Mogwai	-
O C T O B E R	22	Impossible Princess	Kylie Minogue	Japan
O C T O B E R	24	Talk on Corners	The Corrs	-
O C T O B E R	27	Echo Dek	Primal Scream	Remix
O C T O B E R	27	Legendary Tales	Rhapsody	Debut
O C T O B E R	27	Lennon Legend: The Very Best of John Lennon	John Lennon	UK, Compilation
O C T O B E R	27	Endless Nameless	The Wildhearts	-
O C T O B E R	28	Around the Fur	Deftones	-
O C T O B E R	28	Baïda	Faudel	-
O C T O B E R	28	Be Good at It	Neal McCoy	-
O C T O B E R	28	The Best	David Lee Roth	Compilation +1 new track
O C T O B E R	28	The Black Bossalini (a.k.a. Dr. Bomb from Da Bay)	Spice 1	-
O C T O B E R	28	Carnival of Souls: The Final Sessions	Kiss	-
O C T O B E R	28	Chupacabra	Imani Coppola	-
O C T O B E R	28	Eros	Eros Ramazzotti	Compilation
O C T O B E R	28	Forever and Counting	Hot Water Music	-
O C T O B E R	28	The Fury of the Aquabats!	The Aquabats	-
O C T O B E R	28	Galore	The Cure	Compilation
O C T O B E R	28	Get It How U Live!	Hot Boys	-
O C T O B E R	28	Harlem World	Mase	-
O C T O B E R	28	The Jackal (Music from and Inspired by)	Various Artists	Soundtrack
O C T O B E R	28	Jugulator	Judas Priest	-
O C T O B E R	28	Live at Red Rocks 8.15.95	Dave Matthews Band	Live
O C T O B E R	28	Looking for Butter Boy	Archie Roach	Australia
O C T O B E R	28	The Man, the King, the Girl	Deerhoof	-
O C T O B E R	28	More Human Heart	Acumen Nation	
O C T O B E R	28	My Body, the Hand Grenade	Hole	Compilation
O C T O B E R	28	Nightbird	Yanni	Compilation
O C T O B E R	28	The Psycho Realm	Psycho Realm	Debut
O C T O B E R	28	Slip Stitch and Pass	Phish	-
O C T O B E R	28	Yeah, It's That Easy	G. Love & Special Sauce	-
O C T O B E R	28	Zaireeka	The Flaming Lips	-
O C T O B E R	31	Soon	Far	EP
N O V E M B E R	1	Angels Fall First	Nightwish	Debut
N O V E M B E R	3	Spiceworld	Spice Girls	-
N O V E M B E R	3	Paint the Sky with Stars	Enya	Compilation +2 new tracks
N O V E M B E R	3	Queen Rocks	Queen	Compilation +1 new track
N O V E M B E R	3	Keys to Ascension 2	Yes	Live/Studio
N O V E M B E R	3	Greatest Love Songs Vol. 666	HIM	Debut
N O V E M B E R	3	Colours	Adam F	-
N O V E M B E R	3	Distant Horizons	Hawkwind	-
N O V E M B E R	3	[FLA]vour of the Weak	Front Line Assembly	-
N O V E M B E R	4	A-Sides	Soundgarden	Compilation +1 new track
N O V E M B E R	4	All That Matters	Michael Bolton	-
N O V E M B E R	4	Chapter 2: World Domination	Three 6 Mafia	-
N O V E M B E R	4	Come On Over	Shania Twain	Over 40 million copies sold worldwide
N O V E M B E R	4	Excess Baggage	John Lurie	Soundtrack
N O V E M B E R	4	The 18th Letter	Rakim	-
N O V E M B E R	4	Greatest Hits	Richard Marx	-
N O V E M B E R	4	Hearts Once Nourished with Hope and Compassion	Shai Hulud	-
N O V E M B E R	4	Heavy Petting	Bad Manners	-
N O V E M B E R	4	If I Don't Stay the Night	Mindy McCready	-
N O V E M B E R	4	In My Lifetime, Vol. 1	Jay-Z	-
N O V E M B E R	4	Kettle Whistle	Jane's Addiction	Compilation of unreleased and live tracks
N O V E M B E R	4	The Pet Sounds Sessions	The Beach Boys	Box Set
N O V E M B E R	4	The Psycho-Social, Chemical, Biological & Electro-Magnetic Manipulation of Human Consciousness	Jedi Mind Tricks	
N O V E M B E R	4	Signs of Chaos	Testament	-
N O V E M B E R	4	Tibetan Freedom Concert	Various Artists	Live
N O V E M B E R	4	Tracks and Traces	Harmonia '76	-
N O V E M B E R	4	Tribute	Yanni	Live
N O V E M B E R	5	Don't Knock the Baldhead: Live	Bad Manners	Live
N O V E M B E R	7	American Lesion	Greg Graffin	-
N O V E M B E R	7	Gummo (Original Soundtrack)	Various Artists	Soundtrack
N O V E M B E R	7	Unit	Regurgitator	Australia
N O V E M B E R	10	Sampleslaya: Enter the Meatmarket	Armand Van Helden	-
N O V E M B E R	11	Best of King's X	King's X	Compilation
N O V E M B E R	11	Deconstructed	Bush	Remix
N O V E M B E R	11	The Final Chapter	Hypocrisy	-
N O V E M B E R	11	Firecracker	Lisa Loeb	-
N O V E M B E R	11	Higher Ground	Barbra Streisand	-
N O V E M B E R	11	The Omega Sessions	Bad Brains	EP
N O V E M B E R	11	Our Newest Album Ever!	Five Iron Frenzy	-
N O V E M B E R	11	The Ozzman Cometh	Ozzy Osbourne	Compilation +1 new track
N O V E M B E R	11	Satisfaction is the Death of Desire	Hatebreed	-
N O V E M B E R	11	Second-hand Smoke	Sublime	Compilation
N O V E M B E R	11	See It Through My Eyes	Meredith Brooks	-
N O V E M B E R	11	Shut Your Mouth and Open Your Eyes	AFI	-
N O V E M B E R	11	Sympathique	Pink Martini	-
N O V E M B E R	11	To See You	Harry Connick Jr.	-
N O V E M B E R	11	Welcome To Our World	Timbaland & Magoo	-
N O V E M B E R	11	Unpredictable	Mystikal	-
N O V E M B E R	12	Déjà-vu	Hitomi	-
N O V E M B E R	12	HII	DJ Honda	-
N O V E M B E R	12	Live Trax	Megadeth	EP
N O V E M B E R	16	Something Wild	Children of Bodom	-
N O V E M B E R	17	Let's Talk About Love	Celine Dion	31 million copies sold
N O V E M B E R	17	BBC Sessions	Led Zeppelin	Live
N O V E M B E R	17	Breed to Breathe	Napalm Death	EP
N O V E M B E R	17	Caring and Killing	Converge	-
N O V E M B E R	17	Dionysos	Lux Occulta	-
N O V E M B E R	17	Here Comes Da Hool	Da Hool	-
N O V E M B E R	17	Now That's What I Call Music! 38 (UK series)	Various Artists	Compilation
N O V E M B E R	17	Sawtooth	Jonny L	-
N O V E M B E R	17	Scum	Anti-Nowhere League	-
N O V E M B E R	18	Whoracle	In Flames	-
N O V E M B E R	18	The Best That I Could Do 1978–1988	John Mellencamp	Compilation
N O V E M B E R	18	Bonfire	AC/DC	Box Set
N O V E M B E R	18	Inna Heights	Buju Banton	LP
N O V E M B E R	18	Kenny G – Greatest Hits	Kenny G	Compilation
N O V E M B E R	18	Live	Erykah Badu	Live
N O V E M B E R	18	Lock 'n Load	Denis Leary	-
N O V E M B E R	18	The Lonesome Crowded West	Modest Mouse	-
N O V E M B E R	18	Orama	On Thorns I Lay	-
N O V E M B E R	18	ReLoad	Metallica	-
N O V E M B E R	18	Scream 2: Music from the Dimension Motion Picture	Various Artists	Soundtrack
N O V E M B E R	18	Snowed In	Hanson	Christmas
N O V E M B E R	18	Songs from The Capeman	Paul Simon	-
N O V E M B E R	18	Titanic	James Horner	Soundtrack; 30 million copies sold
N O V E M B E R	18	We're Outta Here!	Ramones	Live
N O V E M B E R	19	Survive	B'z	-
N O V E M B E R	24	All Saints	All Saints	Debut
N O V E M B E R	24	Left of the Middle	Natalie Imbruglia	UK
N O V E M B E R	24	Open Your Eyes	Yes	-
N O V E M B E R	24	Stupid Stupid Stupid	Black Grape	-
N O V E M B E R	25	Big Willie Style	Will Smith	-
N O V E M B E R	25	In tha Beginning...There Was Rap	Various Artists	-
N O V E M B E R	25	Mostasteless	Twiztid	Debut
N O V E M B E R	25	MTV Unplugged NYC 1997	Babyface	Live
N O V E M B E R	25	R U Still Down? (Remember Me)	2Pac	-
N O V E M B E R	25	Remix & Repent	Marilyn Manson	EP
N O V E M B E R	25	Sevens	Garth Brooks	-
N O V E M B E R	25	Truly: The Love Songs	Lionel Richie	Compilation
N O V E M B E R	29	The Wanderer	O.A.R.	-
N O V E M B E R	30	Pin Heel Stomp	The 5.6.7.8's	Japan, EP
N O V E M B E R	30	Somber Eyes to the Sky	Shadows Fall	-
N O V E M B E R	?	The 1999 Party	Hawkwind	Live
N O V E M B E R	?	Feeling You Up	Truly	-
N O V E M B E R	?	Lustra	Echobelly	-
N O V E M B E R	?	Popular Mechanics	Piano Magic	Debut
N O V E M B E R	?	Savoir aimer	Florent Pagny	-
N O V E M B E R	?	Sixpence None the Richer	Sixpence None the Richer	-
D E C E M B E R	1	23am	Robert Miles	Europe
D E C E M B E R	1	Aaron Carter	Aaron Carter	Europe
D E C E M B E R	1	Diana, Princess of Wales: Tribute	Various Artists	2-CD charity album
D E C E M B E R	2	Mouse Hunt (Original Motion Picture Soundtrack)	Alan Silvestri	Soundtrack
D E C E M B E R	4	Six	Loverboy	-
D E C E M B E R	7	Carmine Meo	Emma Shapplin	
D E C E M B E R	8	Sounds of Decay	Katatonia	-
D E C E M B E R	8	This Could Be Heaven	Pandora	Sweden
D E C E M B E R	9	Amistad (Original Motion Picture Soundtrack)	John Williams	Soundtrack
D E C E M B E R	9	Dragon Ball Z: Original USA Television Soundtrack	Ron Wasserman	US soundtrack for season 1 and season 2 of Dragon Ball Z
D E C E M B E R	9	Eye & I	Kardinal Offishall	Canada, Debut
D E C E M B E R	9	Many Moods of Moses	Beenie Man	-
D E C E M B E R	9	MTV Unplugged	Bryan Adams	Live
D E C E M B E R	10	Cloudy Cloud Calculator	Takako Minekawa	Japan
D E C E M B E R	10	Sexy Stream Liner	Buck-Tick	Japan
D E C E M B E R	15	Child and Magic	Nobukazu Takemura	Japan
D E C E M B E R	15	My Melody	Queen Pen	Debut
D E C E M B E R	16	Featuring...Ice Cube	Ice Cube	Compilation
D E C E M B E R	16	Riverfenix	Riverfenix	-
D E C E M B E R	20	It's All About the Girls	A New Found Glory	EP
D E C E M B E R	23	Blindside	Blindside	-
D E C E M B E R	25	Maximum II	MAX	Japan

=== Release date unknown ===
- 50,000 B.C. – Shudder to Think
- Alive Alive-O – The Dubliners
- Back Once Again - Hilltop Hoods
- Ball of the Damned – Scanner
- Ball of Fire – The Skatalites
- Chloroform the One You Love – Flickerstick
- Dark Dear Heart – Holly Cole
- Developer – Silkworm
- The Divine Wings of Tragedy – Symphony X
- The Donnas – The Donnas
- English Boy Wonders – Big Big Train
- Entering a New Ride – Big Audio Dynamite
- Erotic Massage – Dog Fashion Disco
- Fallen Is Babylon – Ziggy Marley and the Melody Makers
- First Encounter Tour 1996 – Cluster
- Flash Bulb Emergency Overflow Cavalcade of Remixes – Pigeonhed (Remix)
- From the Vaults – Prism
- Get Your Legs Broke – Len
- Go! – Fair Warning
- Good Charlotte – Good Charlotte
- Good to Go, with a Tribute to Bu – Andrew Cyrille
- Greedy – Headless Chickens
- Handsome Western States – Beulah
- Here Cumz Tha Party – Lostprophets
- How Ace Are Buildings – A
- I'm Not Following You – Edwyn Collins
- Let Us Play! – Coldcut
- Low Estate – 16 Horsepower
- Memories of Love – Future Bible Heroes
- Mirador – Tarnation
- Kill, I Oughtta – Mudvayne
- Muffins – Hoobastank
- The Mysterious Tale of How I Shouted "Wrong-Eyed Jesus!" – Jim White
- Okenspay Ordway: Things I Forgot to Tell Mommy (spoken word album) – Bif Naked
- One Good Turn Deserves Another – Slaves on Dope
- OnlySee – Sia Furler
- Overcast! – Atmosphere
- Ping Pong – Momus
- Plagiarism - Sparks
- Play the Music of Tim Rice & Andrew Lloyd Webber – Hank Marvin and The Shadows
- Pure – 3 Colours Red
- R.A.F.I (France only) – Asian Dub Foundation
- Red, White & Blaine: The Musical – The cast of Waiting for Guffman
- Rain Without End – October Tide
- Shelter – Brand New Heavies
- Sing, Earthboy, Sing! – 2 Skinnee J's
- Silver Sun – Silver Sun
- Smile and Wave – The Headstones
- The Story of My Life – Irma Thomas
- Sydney High – Citizen King
- Tiger Walk – Robben Ford
- Transmission, Flux – Duster
- Turn the Dark Off – Howie B
- Un grito en el corazón – Lynda Thomas
- The Union Underground – The Union Underground
- When the Red King Comes – Elf Power
- When You Land Here, It's Time to Return – Flake Music
- Xero – Linkin Park
- You Can Play These Songs with Chords – Death Cab for Cutie

== Biggest hit singles ==
The following songs achieved the highest positions in the charts of 1997.

#	Artist	Title	Year	Country	Chart Entries
1	Elton John	Candle in the Wind 1997	1997	(United Kingdom)	UK 1 – Sep 1997, US BB 1 of 1997, Netherlands 1 – Sep 1997, Austria 1 – Oct 1997, Switzerland 1 – Sep 1997, Norway 1 – Jan 1997, Poland 1 – Sep 1997, Germany 1 – Jan 1998, Republic of Ireland 1 – Sep 1997, New Zealand 1 for 6 weeks Oct 1997, Australia 1 for 6 weeks Dec 1997, Global 2 (35 M sold) – 1997, Australia 4 of 1997, Japan 11 of all time (international songs), Italy 12 of 1997, TOTP 33, Germany 37 of the 1990s, RYM 85 of 1997, OzNet 433
2	Sean Combs & Faith Evans and 112	I'll Be Missing You	1997	(United States)	UK 1 – Jun 1997, US BB 1 of 1997, Netherlands 1 – Jun 1997, Sweden 1 – Aug 1997, Austria 1 – Jul 1997, Switzerland 1 – Jul 1997, Norway 1 – Jul 1997, Italy 1 of 1997, Germany 1 – Jun 1997, Republic of Ireland 1 – Jul 1997, New Zealand 1 for 5 weeks Jul 1997, Australia 1 for 5 weeks Oct 1997, Poland 5 – Jul 1997, Australia 5 of 1997, Germany 12 of the 1990s, POP 16 of 1997, Global 33 (5 M sold) – 1997, Europe 50 of the 1990s, RYM 99 of 1997
3	Aqua	Barbie Girl	1997	(Denmark)	UK 1 – Oct 1997, US BB 1 of 1997, Netherlands 1 – Sep 1997, Sweden 1 – Sep 1997, Switzerland 1 – Oct 1997, Norway 1 – May 1997, Germany 1 – Jan 1998, Republic of Ireland 1 – Oct 1997, New Zealand 1 for 2 weeks Sep 1997, Australia 1 for 3 weeks Jan 1998, POP 1 of 1997, Italy 2 of 1997, Austria 3 – Oct 1997, France 6 – May 1997, US BB 7 of 1997, Australia 8 of 1997, Germany 36 of the 1990s, Scrobulate 53 of happy
4	No Doubt	Don't Speak	1997	(United States)	UK 1 – Feb 1997, Netherlands 1 – Dec 1996, Sweden 1 – Nov 1996, Switzerland 1 – Jan 1997, Norway 1 – Dec 1996, Poland 1 – Jan 1997, Republic of Ireland 1 – Feb 1997, New Zealand 1 for 2 weeks Jan 1997, Australia 1 for 8 weeks Apr 1997, Austria 2 – Feb 1997, Germany 2 – Jan 1997, Australia 7 of 1997, France 10 – Feb 1997, RYM 10 of 1996, Europe 22 of the 1990s, POP 38 of 1996, Scrobulate 44 of rock, Italy 76 of 1997, Germany 77 of the 1990s, Acclaimed 1098
5	Hanson	MMMBop	1997	(United States)	UK 1 – Jun 1997, US BB 1 of 1997, Sweden 1 – May 1997, Austria 1 – Jun 1997, Switzerland 1 – Jun 1997, Republic of Ireland 1 – Jun 1997, New Zealand 1 for 2 weeks Jun 1997, Australia 1 for 9 weeks Aug 1997, Netherlands 2 – May 1997, Norway 2 – Jun 1997, Australia 2 of 1997, Germany 2 – Jun 1997, Poland 9 – Jun 1997, US BB 17 of 1997, POP 18 of 1997, Scrobulate 69 of fun, RYM 81 of 1996, Germany 187 of the 1990s, Acclaimed 516

== Top 40 Chart hit singles ==
Song title	Artist(s)	Release date(s)	US	UK	Highest chart position	Other Chart Performance(s)
"2 Become 1"	Spice Girls	January 1997	4	1	1 (Ireland, Israel, Scotland, Spain, United States)	See chart performance entry
"3 AM"	Matchbox Twenty	November 1997	n/a	64	1 (Canada)	See chart performance entry
"4 Seasons of Loneliness"	Boyz II Men	September 1997	1	10	1 (United States)	See chart performance entry
"5,6,7,8"	Steps	November 1997	n/a	14	1 (Australia)	See chart performance entry
"6 Underground"	Sneaker Pimps	May 1997	45	9	9 (United Kingdom)	7 (US Billboard Alternative Airplay) - 11 (Scotland) - 31 (US Billboard Adult Top 40) - 62 (Australia)
"Ain't Talkin' 'bout Dub"	Apollo 440	February 1997	n/a	7	1 (Romania)	See chart performance entry
"Ain't That Just the Way"	Lutricia McNeal	November 1997	63	6	1 (Sweden)	See chart performance entry
"Alane"	Wes Madiko	May 1997	n/a	11	1 (4 countries)	See chart performance entry
"All I Want"	The Offspring	January 1997	n/a	31	4 (Spain)	See chart performance entry
"Alone"	Bee Gees	February 1997	28	5	1 (Poland)	See chart performance entry
"Alright"	Jamiroquai	April 1997	78	6	2 (Iceland)	See chart performance entry
"Angel of Mine"	Eternal	September 1997	n/a	4	3 (Norway)	See chart performance entry
"Another Suitcase in Another Hall"	Madonna	March 1997	n/a	7	6 (Belgium)	See chart performance entry
"Anywhere for You"	Backstreet Boys	February 1997	n/a	4	1 (Lithuania)	See chart performance entry
"Around the World"	Daft Punk	April 1997	61	5	1 (Iceland, Italy)	See chart performance entry
"As Long As You Love Me"	Backstreet Boys	September 1997	n/a	3	1 (Lithuania, New Zealand, Romania)	See chart performance entry
"Avenues"	Refugee Camp All-Stars & Pras & Ky-Mani Marley	1997	35	n/a	2 (Norway)	See chart performance entry
"Baby Can I Hold You"	Boyzone	November 1997	n/a	2	2 (Ireland, Scotland, United Kingdom)	See chart performance entry
"Bailando"	Paradisio	1997	n/a	n/a	1 (5 countries)	See chart performance entry
"Barbie Girl"	Aqua	April 1997	7	1	1 (14 countries)	See chart performance entry
"Barrel of a Gun"	Depeche Mode	February 1997	47	4	1 (6 countries)	See chart performance entry
"Because It's Love"	The Kelly Family	1997	n/a	n/a	2 (Austria, Switzerland)	3 (Germany) - 6 (Netherlands [Dutch Top 40]) - 11 (Belgium) - 13 (Netherlands [Single Top 100])
"Been Around the World"	Puff Daddy & The Notorious B.I.G. & Mase	November 1997	2	20	2 (United States)	See chart performance entry
"Beetlebum"	Blur	January 1997	n/a	1	1 (Scotland, United Kingdom)	See chart performance entry
"Bellissima"	DJ Quicksilver	January 1997	n/a	n/a	4 (Germany)	See chart performance entry
"Bitch"	Meredith Brooks	March 1997	2	6	2 (Australia, Canada, United States)	See chart performance entry
"Bitter Sweet Symphony"	The Verve	June 1997	12	2	1 (Scotland)	See chart performance entry
"Block Rockin' Beats"	The Chemical Brothers	March 1997	n/a	1	1 (United Kingdom)	See chart performance entry
*"Blood on the Dance Floor"	Michael Jackson	March 1997	42	1	1 (4 countries)	See chart performance entry
"Brimful of Asha"	Cornershop	August 1997	n/a	1	1 (Scotland, United Kingdom)	See chart performance entry
"Burnin'"	Cue	1997	n/a	n/a	1 (Sweden)	4 (Norway) - 9 (Finland) - 19 (Finland)
"C U When U Get There"	Coolio	June 1997	12	3	2 (Norway, Sweden, Switzerland)	See chart performance entry
"Call the Man"	Celine Dion	June 1997	n/a	11	5 (Netherlands)	See chart performance entry
"Candle in the Wind '97"	Elton John	September 1997	1	1	1 (21 countries)	See chart performance entry
"Can't Nobody Hold Me Down"	Puff Daddy & Mase	January 1997	1	19	1 (United States)	See chart performance entry
"Casanova"	Ultimate Kaos	February 1997	n/a	24	2 (Netherlands)	See chart performance entry
"Cherish"	Pappa Bear & Van der Toorn	October 1997	n/a	47	1 (New Zealand)	See chart performance entry
"Clementine"	Mark Owen	February 1997	n/a	3	2 (Japan, Spain)	See chart performance entry
"Come into My Life"	Gala	November 1997	n/a	38	1 (Italy, Spain)	See chart performance entry
"Con te partirò (Time to Say Goodbye)"	Andrea Bocelli & Sarah Brightman	1997	n/a	n/a	1 (Belgium, France)	10 (Europe) - 18 (Netherlands [Single Top 100]) - 20 (Netherlands [Dutch Top 40])
"Crush on You"	Aaron Carter	August 1997	n/a	9	5 (Germany, Switzerland)	See chart performance entry
"Da Funk"	Daft Punk	February 1997	n/a	7	5 (Ireland, Scotland)	See chart performance entry
"Da Ya Think I'm Sexy?"	N-Trance	October 1997	n/a	7	1 (Czech Republic, New Zealand)	See chart performance entry
"D.I.S.C.O."	N-Trance	March 1997	n/a	11	8 (Scotland)	See chart performance entry
"Discothèque"	U2	February 1997	10	1	1 (7 countries)	See chart performance entry
"Don't Cry for Me Argentina"	Madonna	January 1997	8	3	1 (6 countries)	See chart performance entry
"The Drugs Don't Work"	The Verve	September 1997	n/a	1	1 (Scotland, United Kingdom)	See chart performance entry
"Du Hast"	Rammstein	July 1997	n/a	186	5 (Germany)	See chart performance entry
"Du liebst mich nicht"	Sabrina Setlur	1997	n/a	n/a	1 (Germany)	3 (Austria, Switzerland)
"D'You Know What I Mean?"	Oasis	July 1997	n/a	1	1 (5 countries)	See chart performance entry
"Ecuador"	Sash!	April 1997	n/a	2	1 (4 countries)	See chart performance entry
"Elegantly Wasted"	INXS	March 1997	n/a	20	1 (Canada)	See chart performance entry
"Encore Une Fois"	Sash!	January 1997	n/a	2	1 (Europe, Greece, Ireland)	See chart performance entry
"The End Is the Beginning Is the End"	The Smashing Pumpkins	March 1997	n/a	10	3 (Iceland, Spain)	See chart performance entry
"Everybody (Backstreet's Back)"	Backstreet Boys	June 1997	4	3	1 (Hungary, Romania, Spain)	See chart performance entry
"Everything's Gonna Be Alright"	Sweetbox	October 1997	46	5	2 (Spain)	See chart performance entry
"Falling in Love (Is Hard on the Knees)"	Aerosmith	February 1997	35	22	1 (Spain)	See chart performance entry
"Feel So Good"	Mase	October 1997	5	10	5 (United States)	See chart performance entry
"Fire"	Scooter	March 1997	n/a	45	1 (Finland)	See chart performance entry
"Fire Water Burn"	Bloodhound Gang	February 1997	n/a	n/a	2 (Norway)	See chart performance entry
"Fix"	Blackstreet	July 1997	58	7	3 (Canada)	See chart performance entry
"Flash"	B.B.E.	January 1997	n/a	5	3 (Scotland)	See chart performance entry
"Fly"	Sugar Ray	May 1997	n/a	58	1 (Canada)	See chart performance entry
"Fly Like an Eagle"	Seal	January 1997	10	13	2 (Canada)	See chart performance entry
"Foolish Games"	Jewel	July 1997	2	n/a	2 (Canada, United States)	See chart performance entry
"For You I Will"	Monica	February 1997	4	27	2 (New Zealand)	See chart performance entry
"Formula"	DJ Visage	1997	n/a	n/a	1 (Belgium)	5 (Austria) - 6 (Netherlands) - 24 (France) - 34 (Australia)
"Free"	DJ Quicksilver	June 1997	n/a	7	3 (Ireland)	4 (Spain, Germany) - 9 (Norway) - 11 (Switzerland) - 12 (Austria) - 13 (Sweden)
"Free"	Ultra Naté	March 1997	75	4	1 (Italy)	See chart performance entry
"Freedom"	Robert Miles	November 1997	n/a	15	2 (Italy)	See chart performance entry
"Gotham City"	R. Kelly	June 1997	9	9	3 (Germany)	See chart performance entry
"Got 'til It's Gone"	Janet Jackson & Q-Tip & Joni Mitchell	September 1997	n/a	6	3 (Hungary)	See chart performance entry
*"Guantanamera"	Wyclef Jean & Celia Cruz & Lauryn Hill & Jeni Fujita	October 1997	n/a	25	15 (New Zealand)	See chart performance entry
"Hard to Say I'm Sorry"	Az Yet & Peter Cetera	February 1997	8	7	1 (New Zealand)	See chart performance entry
"Hedonism (Just Because You Feel Good)"	Skunk Anansie	January 1997	n/a	13	1 (Iceland)	See chart performance entry
"He's Comin'"	Nana	September 1997	n/a	n/a	4 (Germany)	11 (Switzerland) - 14 (Austria)
"Here We Go"	NSYNC	May 1997	n/a	n/a	5 (Switzerland)	8 (Austria, Germany) - 10 (Netherlands [Dutch Top 40]) - 66 (Netherlands [Single Top 100])
"HIStory/Ghosts"	Michael Jackson	1997	n/a	5	3 (Italy)	4 (Spain) - 14 (Germany, Netherlands) - 16 (Switzerland) - 26 (France) - 29 (New Zealand)
"Hit 'Em High (The Monstars' Anthem)"	B-Real& Coolio & Method Man& LL Cool J& Busta Rhymes	January 1997	n/a	8	1 (Norway)	See chart performance entry
"Home"	Depeche Mode	June 1997	88	23	1 (Italy)	See chart performance entry
"Honey"	Mariah Carey	August 1997	1	3	1 (Canada, United States)	See chart performance entry
"How Come, How Long"	Babyface & Stevie Wonder	July 1997	n/a	10	2 (Netherlands [Dutch Top 40]/[Single Top 100])	See chart performance entry
"How Do I Live"	LeAnn Rimes	May 1997	2	7	2 (United States)	See chart performance entry
"Hypnotize"	The Notorious B.I.G.	March 1997	1	10	1 (United States)	See chart performance entry
"I Do"	Lisa Loeb	October 1997	17	83	1 (Canada)	See chart performance entry
"I Don't Want To"	Toni Braxton	March 1997	19	9	7 (Iceland)	See chart performance entry
"I Finally Found Someone"	Bryan Adams & Barbra Streisand	January 1997	8	10	1 (Ireland)	See chart performance entry
"I Know Where It's At"	All Saints	August 1997	36	4	2 (Canada)	See chart performance entry
"I Never Loved You Anyway"	The Corrs	December 1997	n/a	43	31 (Australia)	37 (Scotland) - 49 (Canada Adult Contemporary)
"I Shot the Sheriff"	Warren G	February 1997	20	2	1 (New Zealand)	See chart performance entry
"I Wanna Be the Only One"	Eternal & BeBe Winans	May 1997	n/a	1	1 (Scotland, United Kingdom)	See chart performance entry
"I Want You"	Savage Garden	February 1997	4	11	1 (Canada)	See chart performance entry
"I Will Come to You"	Hanson	November 1997	9	5	1 (Sweden)	See chart performance entry
"If God Will Send His Angels"	U2	December 1997	n/a	12	4 (Belgium, Iceland)	See chart performance entry
"I'll Be Missing You"	Puff Daddy and The Family	May 1997	1	1	1 (19 countries)	See chart performance entry
"It's All About The Benjamins (Remix)"	Puff Daddy and The Family	August 1997	2	18	2 (United States)	1 (U.S. Billboard Hot R&B/Hip-Hop Singles & Tracks, U.S. Billboard Hot Rap Singles) - 2 (U.S. Billboard Hot 100 Singles Sales)
"It's No Good"	Depeche Mode	March 1997	38	5	1 (4 countries)	See chart performance entry
"James Bond Theme (Moby's Re-Version)"	Moby	November 1997	n/a	8	1 (Iceland)	See chart performance entry
"Johnny B"	Down Low	1997	n/a	n/a	4 (Germany)	7 (Finland) - 8 (Switzerland)
"Jojo Action"	Mr. President	June 1997	n/a	73	1 (Hungary)	See chart performance entry
"Just for You"	M People	September 1997	n/a	8	8 (Scotland, United Kingdom)	See chart performance entry
"Karma Police"	Radiohead	August 1997	n/a	8	1 (Iceland)	See chart performance entry
"Kiss the Rain"	Billie Myers	September 1997	15	4	2 (Canada)	See chart performance entry
"Laura non c'è"	Nek	February 1997	n/a	59	1 (Italy)	See chart performance entry
"Let a Boy Cry"	Gala	January 1997	n/a	11	1 (Belgium, France, Italy, Spain)	See chart performance entry
"Lonely"	Nana	March 1997	n/a	n/a	1 (Germany, Romania, Switzerland)	See chart performance entry
"Look Into My Eyes"	Bone Thugs-N-Harmony	June 1997	4	16	3 (New Zealand)	4 (US Billboard Hot R&B/Hip-Hop Songs) - 6 (UK Hip Hop/R&B charts) - 15 (US Billboard Rhythmic charts)
"Love Gets Me Every Time"	Shania Twain	September 1997	25	n/a	4 (Canada)	1 (Canada country Tracks, US Billboard Hot Country Songs)
"Love Shine a Light"	Katrina and the Waves	April 1997	n/a	3	1 (Israel)	See chart performance entry
"Love Won't Wait"	Gary Barlow	April 1997	n/a	1	1 (Lithuania, Spain, United Kingdom)	See chart performance entry
"Lovefool"	The Cardigans	May 1997	n/a	2	1 (Scotland, New Zealand)	See chart performance entry
"Mama"	Spice Girls	March 1997	n/a	1	1 (4 countries)	See chart performance entry
"María"	Ricky Martin	1997	88	6	1 (18 countries)	See chart performance entry
"Meet Her at the Love Parade"	Da Hool	August 1997	n/a	15	1 (Iceland)	See chart performance entry
"The Memory Remains"	Metallica	November 1997	28	13	1 (Finland, Iceland)	See chart performance entry
"Men in Black"	Will Smith	June 1997	n/a	1	1 (11 countries)	See chart performance entry
"Midnight in Chelsea"	Jon Bon Jovi	June 1997	n/a	4	1 (Spain)	See chart performance entry
"MMMBop"	Hanson	April 1997	1	1	1 (12 countries)	See chart performance entry
"Mo Money Mo Problems"	The Notorious B.I.G.	July 1997	1	6	1 (Netherlands, United States)	See chart performance entry
"Mr. DJ"	Dr. Alban	1997	n/a	n/a	3 (Spain)	6 (Sweden) - 8 (Finland) - 21 (Austria) - 70 (Germany) - 79 (Europe)
"My Heart Will Go On"	Celine Dion	November 1997	1	1	1 (25 countries)	See chart performance entry
"My Love Is the Shhh!"	Somethin' for the People	August 1997	4	n/a	2 (Germany)	See chart performance entry
"My Oh My"	Aqua	February 1997	n/a	6	2 (Denmark, Scotland)	See chart performance entry
"Nancy Boy"	Placebo	January 1997	n/a	4	4 (United Kingdom)	5 (Scotland) - 19 (Europe) - 19 (Iceland)
"No Tengo Dinero"	Los Umbrellos	May 1997	42	33	1 (Austria)	See chart performance entry
"Nobody's Wife"	Anouk	1997	n/a	n/a	1 (Iceland)	See chart performance entry
"Oh La La La"	2 Eivissa	June 1997	n/a	13	1 (Spain)	See chart performance entry
"Old Before I Die"	Robbie Williams	April 1997	n/a	2	1 (Scotland, Spain)	See chart performance entry
"Older"	George Michael	January 1997	n/a	3	3 (Spain, United Kingdom)	See chart performance entry
"On Your Own"	Blur	July 1997	n/a	5	5 (Scotland, United Kingdom)	20 (Iceland) - 27 (Ireland) - 33 (Europe) - 69 (Australia)
"One Headlight"	The Wallflowers	January 1997	n/a	54	1 (Canada)	See chart performance entry
"The One I Gave My Heart To"	Aaliyah	August 1997	9	30	9 (United States)	See chart performance entry
"Open Your Eyes"	Guano Apes	August 1997	n/a	n/a	5 (Germany)	10 (Austria) - 11 (Switzerland) - 14 (Belgium) - 18 (Netherlands [Dutch Top 40]) - 19 (Netherlands [Single Top 100]) - 24 (U.S. Billboard Mainstream Rock - charted in 2000)
"Paranoid Android"	Radiohead	May 1997	n/a	3	2 (Scotland)	See chart performance entry
"Perfect Day"	Lou Reed & Various Artists	November 1997	n/a	1	1 (4 countries)	See chart performance entry
"Picture of You"	Boyzone	July 1997	n/a	2	1 (Scotland)	See chart performance entry

=== Other Chart hit singles ===
- "All Cried Out" – Allure & 112 (#4 US)
- "Ameno" - Era (#2 BE, #5 FR, SWE)
- "The Beautiful People" - Marilyn Manson
- "Break Me Shake Me" - Savage Garden
- "Breathe" - Midge Ure
- "Breathe" – The Prodigy (#1 DEN, FIN, NOR, SP, SWE, UK)
- "Clumsy" – Our Lady Peace
- "Don't Let Go (Love)" – En Vogue (#1 DEN, NOR, #2 NLD, US)
- "Don't Speak" – No Doubt (#1 AUS, BE, CAN, DEN, IRL, NLD, NOR, SWE, SWI, UK)
- "Du fehlst mir" - Cappuccino
- "Greedy Fly" – Bush
- "I Have a Dream/Bellissima" – DJ Quicksilver (#2 IRL, #3 SP, #4 GER, UK)
- "I'll Be There for You" - Solid HarmoniE
- "Je t'aime" – Lara Fabian
- "Last Night on Earth" – U2 (#1 CAN, #4 ITL, #6 FIN, #10 UK)
- "Nothing Lasts Forever" – Echo & the Bunnymen (#8 UK)
- "Piece of My Heart" - Shaggy & Marsha Morrison
- "Please" – U2 (#6 IRL, NLD, #7 FIN, IT, UK)
- "Please Don't Go" – No Mercy (#4 UK, #5 AUT, #6 NLD)
- "Prince Igor" – Warren G (#1 NOR, #3 BE, SWE, #6 FR, NLD)
- "Push" - Matchbox Twenty
- "Remember Me" – Blue Boy
- "Rescue Me" - Bell, Book & Candle
- "Rumble in the Jungle" - The Fugees
- "Quanto amore sei" – Eros Ramazzotti (#3 SP, #7 FIN, #10 IT)
- "Quit Playing Games (with My Heart)" – Backstreet Boys (#1 AUT, GER, SWI, #2 UK, US)
- "The Rascal King" – Mighty Mighty Bosstones (#4 CAN)
- "The Real Thing" – Lisa Stansfield
- "A Red Letter Day" - Pet Shop Boys
- "The Saint" - Orbital
- "Samba de Janeiro" – Bellini (#2 GER, SWI, #3 AUT, FR)
- "Saturday Night" – Suede (#4 DEN, #6 UK, #7 FIN)
- "Say What You Want" – Texas (#3 UK)
- "Say You'll Be There" – Spice Girls (#1 UK, FIN, SCO, #3 US)
- "Secret Garden" - Bruce Springsteen
- "Semi-Charmed Life" – Third Eye Blind (#2 CAN, #4 US)
- "Sex on the Beach" – T-Spoon (#2 UK, #3 IRL, NLD, #4 BE)
- "She's a Star" – James (#9 UK)
- "Show Me Love" – Robyn (#2 CAN, #7 US, #8 UK)
- "Sick with Love" - Robyn Loau (# 21 AUS)
- "Smack My Bitch Up" – The Prodigy (#1 FIN, SP, #6 IRL)
- "Something About the Way You Look Tonight" – Elton John (#1 US)
- "Something Goin' On (In Your Soul)" - Todd Terry & Martha Wash & Jocelyn Brown
- "Song 2" – Blur (#2 UK, #4 AUS, #8 BE)
- "A Song for Mama" – Boyz II Men (#7 US)
- "Spice Up Your Life" – Spice Girls (#1 UK, #2 BE, CAN, DEN, NLD, NZ, SP, SWE)
- "Stand by Me" – Oasis (#2 UK)
- "Star People '97" – George Michael (#1 DEN, #2 UK, #4 SP)
- "Staring at the Sun" – U2 (#2 CAN, #3 UK, #4 FIN, IRL, NZ)
- "Stay" – Sash! (#2 IT, UK, #3 DEN, NOR)
- "Step by Step" – Whitney Houston (#2 SP, #6 AUT, #8 GER)
- "Sunchyme" – Dario G (#2 DEN, UK, SWI)
- "Sunny Came Home" – Shawn Colvin (#7 US)
- "Superhero" - Daze
- "Tearin' Up My Heart" – 'N Sync (#3 CAN, #4 AUT, GER)
- "Tic, Tic Tac" – Chilli & Carrapicho (#2 AUT, #4 NOR, #5 GER)
- "To the Moon and Back" – Savage Garden (#1 AUS, #3 UK, #4 NZ)
- "Together Again" – Janet Jackson (#1 US, NLD)
- "Tomorrow Never Dies" – Sheryl Crow
- "Tout" – Lara Fabian
- "Truly Madly Deeply" – Savage Garden (#1 AUS, CAN, US)
- "Tell Him" – Barbra Streisand & Celine Dion (#1 NLD, #2 IRL, #3 BE, UK)
- "Time Is Tickin' Away" – C-Block (#5 GER, #9 SWI)
- "Tubthumping" – Chumbawamba (#1 CAN, IRL, IT, NZ)
- "Uh La La La" – Alexia (#1 SP, #2 FIN, #5 IRL, IT)
- "Vamos a la Discoteca" – Paradisio (#3 FIN, SWE, #6 NOR)
- "Vivo per lei" – Andrea Bocelli & Giorgia Todrani (#1 BE, FR, SP, SWI)
- "Walk on By" – Young Deenay & Sascha Schmitz
- "Walkin' on the Sun" – Smash Mouth (#3 CAN, IT, #5 SP)
- "Wannabe" – Spice Girls (#1 UK, US, AUS, BE, DEN, FIN, FR, GER, HK, IRL, ISR, NLD, NOR, NZ, SP, SWE, SWI)
- "Warum?" – Tic Tac Toe (#1 AUT, GER, SWI)
- "We Trying to Stay Alive" - Wyclef Jean & John Forté & Pras
- "When I Die" – No Mercy (#1 AUT, NLD, #2 AUS)
- "When Susannah Cries" – Espen Lind
- "Where Have All the Cowboys Gone?" – Paula Cole (#8 US)
- "Where's the Love" – Hanson (#2 AUS, CAN, #4 UK)
- "Who Do You Think You Are" – Spice Girls (#1 UK, IRL, #2 NLD)
- "You Have Been Loved/The Strangest Thing '97" – George Michael (#2 UK)
- "You Make Me Wanna..." – Usher (#1 UK, #2 US)
- "You Might Need Somebody" – Shola Ama (#4 UK, #8 NLD, NZ)
- "You Sexy Thing" – T-Shirt
- "You Were Meant for Me" – Jewel (#2 CAN, US, #3 AUS)
- "Your Woman" – White Town (#1 UK, SP, #3 IT)
- "You're Not Alone" – Olive (#1 UK, #3 IRL, #4 DEN)
- "Young Boy" - Paul McCartney

== Notable singles ==
Song title	Artist(s)	Release date(s)	Other Chart Performance(s)
"Autumn Sweater"	Yo La Tengo	April 1997	n/a
"Come to Daddy"	Aphex Twin	August 1997	5 (UK Dance) - 9 (UK Indie Singles Chart) - 10 (Denmark) - 36 (United Kingdom)
"Karma Police"	Radiohead	August 1997	See chart performance entry
"Miss Modular"	Stereolab	September 1997	n/a
"My Own Summer (Shove It)"	Deftones	December 1997	29 (United Kingdom) - 33 (Scotland)
"Over"	Portishead	November 1997	25 (United Kingdom) - 159 (Australia)
"Song 2"	Blur	April 1997	See chart performance entry
"Underwater Love"	Smoke City	March 1997	See chart performance entry
"You Know My Steez"	Gang Starr	November 1997	5 (US Billboard Hot Rap Songs) - 32 (US Billboard Hot R&B/Hip-Hop Songs) - 76 (United States)

=== Other Notable singles ===
- "Can't Get Free" - Cranes
- "Rock City" - The Avalanches
- "Sick with Love" - Robyn Loau

== Classical music ==
=== Premieres ===
Sortable table
Composer	Composition	Date	Location	Performers
Davies, Peter Maxwell	Concerto for Piano and Orchestra	1997-11-7	(United Kingdom) Nottingham	Stott, Royal Philharmonic Orchestra – Davies
Enescu, George	Symphony No. 4	1997-10-2	(Romania) Bucharest	George Enescu Philharmonic Orchestra – Cristian Mandeal

=== Compositions ===
- Leonardo Balada – Concierto Magico for guitar and orchestra
- Silvie Bodorova – Terezin Ghetto Requiem
- Peter Maxwell Davies – Concerto for Piano and Orchestra
- Henri Dutilleux
  - The Shadows of Time, for three children's voices and orchestra
  - Slava's Fanfare, for spatial ensemble
- Lorenzo Ferrero
  - Capriccio for piano and string orchestra
  - Concerto for violin, cello, piano and orchestra
  - Storie di neve, music for the Sestriere Alpine World Ski Championships opening ceremony of 1997
  - Championship Suite, for large orchestra
  - Three Baroque Buildings
- Andrew Glover – The Fickle Virgin of Seventeen Summers: A Quartet for Strings
- Sofia Gubaidulina – The Canticle of the Sun
- Jaakko Mäntyjärvi – Canticum Calamitatis Maritiamae
- David Sawer – The Greatest Happiness Principle
- Tan Dun – Symphony 1997: Heaven, Earth, Mankind
- Takashi Yoshimatsu
  - Around the Round Ground for guitar and bells
  - Piano Concerto Memo Flora for piano and orchestra
  - And Birds Are Still... for string orchestra, Op. 72

== Opera ==
- Robert Ashley – Balseros
- Antonio Braga – San Domenico di Guzman (oratorio)
- Michael Daugherty – Jackie O
- Peter Lieberson – Ashoka's Dream
- Einojuhani Rautavaara – Aleksis Kivi

== Musical theater ==
- 1776 – Broadway revival
- Annie – Broadway revival
- Candide (Leonard Bernstein) – Broadway revival
- Dream – Broadway production opened at the Royale Theatre and ran for 109 performances
- Forever Tango – Broadway production
- Jekyll & Hyde – Broadway production opened at the Plymouth Theatre and ran for 1543 performances
- The Life – Broadway production opened at the Ethel Barrymore Theatre and ran for 463 performances
- The Lion King – Broadway production opened at the New Amsterdam Theatre and is still running, with over 6700 performances to date, making it the third longest run in Broadway history.
- The Scarlet Pimpernel – Broadway production opened at the Neil Simon Theatre and ran for 772 performances
- Side Show – Broadway production opened at the Richard Rodgers Theatre and ran for 91 performances
- Snow.Wolf.Lake – Hong Kong's first modern musical opened at the Hong Kong Coliseum and ran for 42 performances
- Steel Pier – Broadway production opened at the Richard Rodgers Theatre and ran for 76 performances
- Street Corner Symphony – Broadway production
- Titanic – Broadway production opened at the Lunt-Fontanne Theatre and ran for 804 performances
- Triumph of Love – Broadway production opened at the Royale Theatre and ran for 85 performances

== Musical films ==
- Amy
- Anastasia (animated feature)
- Babes in Toyland (animated feature)
- Bandits
- Cats Don't Dance (animated feature)
- Cinderella (telefilm)
- Elton John: Tantrums & Tiaras
- Hercules (animated feature)
- Holiday in Your Heart (telefilm)
- Michael Jackson: HIStory on Film, Volume II
- Music for Montserrat (telefilm)
- Rhyme & Reason
- Same Old Song
- Selena
- Slaves to the Underground
- Spiceworld
- Telling Lies in America
- The Crazy Stranger
- The Harmonists
- The Next Step
- The Right Connections
- The Tango Lesson
- The Wiggles Movie
- Wild Man Blues
- Year of the Horse

== Births ==
- January 1 – Noah Kahan, American folk musician
- January 7 – Ayumi Ishida, Japanese pop singer and dancer (Morning Musume)
- January 9 – Daigo Nishihata, Japanese singer (Naniwa Danshi)
- January 11 – Cody Simpson, Australian surf pop singer-songwriter, musician and athlete
- January 14 – Jaira Burns, American singer-songwriter
- January 17 – Jack Vidgen, Australian singer, 2011 Australia's Got Talent winner, activist and television personality
- January 20 – Blueface, American rapper
- January 21 – Edan Lui, Hong Kong singer (MIRROR)
- January 24 – CK Wong, Hong Kong singer-songwriter (STRAYZ)
- January 28 – Nutsa Buzaladze, Georgian singer
- January 31 – Miyeon, South Korean singer, ((G)I-dle)
- February 1 – Jihyo, South Korean singer (TWICE)
- February 8
  - Bella Poarch, Filipino American singer, songwriter, activist, veteran and internet star (Friend of Grimes)
  - Rude-α, Japanese rapper
- February 10 – Maan de Steenwinkel, Dutch singer, actress
- February 11
  - Nasty C, South African rapper
  - Rosé, South Korean-New Zealand singer and dancer (Blackpink)
- February 15 – Mia Boyka, Russian singer
- February 16 – Ren Meguro, Japanese singer (Snow Man)
- February 18 – DK, South Korean singer (Seventeen)
- February 23 – Shiena Nishizawa, Japanese singer
- March 2 – Becky G, Mexican-American singer-songwriter, actress
- March 3 – Camila Cabello, Cuban-American singer/songwriter, dancer and actress
- March 4 – Daoko, Japanese singer
- March 8 – Jurina Matsui - Japanese idol, actress, talent, and model (former SKE48)
- March 21 – Tini Stoessel, Argentine actress, singer, songwriter, dancer and model.
- March 24 – Mina, Japanese singer and dancer (TWICE)
- March 26 – Glowie, Icelandic singer
- March 27 – Lisa, Thai singer, dancer, rapper (Blackpink)
- March 29 – Arón Piper, German-Spanish actor and singer
- March 30 – Bad Gyal, Spanish singer
- April 2 – Peach PRC, Australian pop singer, songwriter, activist, and internet personality
- April 3 – Kiana Lede, American singer-songwriter, actress, pianist and actress
- April 6 – Mingyu, South Korean rapper and singer (Seventeen)
- April 8 - Saygrace, Australian singer-songwriter
- April 27 – Sayuki Takagi, Japanese singer
- May 6 – Scene Queen, American metal musician
- May 7
  - Irori Maeda, Japanese singer
  - Rico Nasty, American rapper and trap metal artist
- May 11
  - Lana Condor, American actress and dancer
  - Coi Leray, American rapper, singer-songwriter and dancer
- May 20 - Omar Apollo. American bilingual singer and songwriter
- May 26 - Grace Carter, English singer-songwriter
- May 27 – Soccer Mommy, American singer-songwriter
- May 31 – Cupcakke, American rapper, LBTQ+ advocate
- June 9 - Tay Iwar, a Nigerian singer, songwriter, composer, sound engineer and record producer
- June 11
  - Kodak Black, American rapper
  - Jorja Smith, British singer
- June 13 – 070 Shake, American rapper, singer, songwriter, and actress
- June 14 – Fujii Kaze, Japanese singer
- June 15 – Bali Baby, American rapper
- June 17 - 070 Shake, American rapper and singer
- June 21 – Rebecca Black, American singer-songwriter, YouTube artist
- June 22 – Dinah Jane, American singer and member of the girl group Fifth Harmony
- June 25
  - Jacquie Lee, American singer, and 2013 The Voice contestant
  - Faye Webster, American singer-songwriter
  - Raylee, Norwegian singer, dancer and actress
- June 26
  - Abi Ann, American singer-songwriter
  - Baek Ye-rin, South Korean singer-songwriter and former member of 15&
- June 27 – H.E.R., American singer-songwriter
- July 1 – Indigo De Souza, American singer
- July 5
  - Cloud Wan, Hong Kong singer and actress
  - Park Ji-min South Korean singer-songwriter, television host and former member of 15&
- July 7 - James Marriott, British YouTuber and musician
- July 7 – Erina Ikuta, Japanese pop singer, dancer, actress and model (Morning Musume)
- July 8 – Lauran Hibberd, British singer-songwriter
- July 10 – Rena Katō, Japanese singer
- July 28 - Gabbriette, American model and musician
- July 30 – Finneas O'Connell, American singer-songwriter, actor, record producer and musician, brother of and collaborator with Billie Eilish
- August 5
  - Olivia Holt, American actress and singer
  - KennyHoopla, American singer
- August 7
  - Yungblud, English alternative rock musician, singer-songwriter
  - Evaluna Montaner, a Venezuelan actress, singer, music director, dancer, television presenter
  - Valentina Cho, Hong Kong singer-songwriter (STRAYZ)
- August 9 – Kazuya Ohashi, Japanese singer (Naniwa Danshi)
- August 10 – Sara Takatsuki, Japanese actress, model and singer
- August 11
  - Kanon Kimoto, former Japanese idol and actress (former SKE48)
  - Saba, Danish singer, musical theatre actress
- August 16 – Greyson Chance, American singer, songwriter, and pianist
- August 19 – Baby Queen, British singer-songwriter born in Durban South Africa
- August 24 – Alan Walker, English-Norwegian DJ and record producer
- August 25 – Maty Noyes, American singer (Kygo)
- August 26
  - Cordae, American rapper, singer, and songwriter
  - Mae Muller – British singer-songwriter who represented the United Kingdom at Eurovision Song Contest 2023
- August 27 - Guitarricadelafuente, Spanish singer-songwriter, guitarist and musician based in Zaragoza
- August 28 – Bazzi, American singer-songwriter (Camilla Cabello)
- September 1 – Jungkook, South Korean singer-songwriter, record producer, and member of BTS
- September 2 – Sanah, Polish singer, songwriter, violinist, and composer
- September 8 - Tessa, Danish rapper
- September 14 – Benjamin Ingrosso, Swedish singer-songwriter
- September 24 – Malaya Watson, American singer
- October 1 – Sam Verlinden, New Zealand singer and actor
- October 2 - Rubi Rose, American rapper, songwriter and model
- October 3 - Bang Chan, Australian singer, rapper, songwriter, and record producer
- October 6 – Michael J. Woodard, American singer
- October 7 – J. Rey Soul, Filipino-American singer
- October 8 – Bella Thorne, American actress and singer
- October 9 – Megan Moroney, American country singer
- October 10 – DDG, American rapper, singer and YouTuber
- October 14 – Miru Shiroma, Japanese singer and model
- October 23 – Minnie, Thai singer-songwriter, record producer, and member of (G)I-dle
- October 24
  - Arthur Gunn, American singer
  - Raye, British singer-songwriter and activist
- November 3 – Ski Aggu, German musician, rapper, and singer
- November 6 – Jamal Roberts, American singer
- November 10 – Joost Klein, Dutch musician, rapper, singer, and former YouTuber
- November 18 - Hope Tala, British singer-songwriter
- November 23
  - Akari Takeuchi, Japanese singer
  - Kim Dracula, Australian metal musician
- November 24 – Reiley, Faroese singer
- December 5 – Maddie Poppe, American singer-songwriter and multi instrumentalist (Winner of American Idol 16)
- December 16
  - Snot, American rapper
  - Zara Larsson, Swedish singer-songwriter, musician, and activist
  - Nat Ćmiel (born Natasha Yelin Chang), Singaporean songwriter and producer known for the musical project, Yeule
- December 20 – Suzuka Nakamoto, Japanese singer (Babymetal)
- December 21
  - Kida, Kosovan singer
  - Pedro Sampaio, Brazilian singer and music producer

== Deaths ==
- January 1
  - Ivan Graziani, Italian singer-songwriter and guitarist, 51
  - Townes Van Zandt, country-folk musician, 52
- January 2 – Randy California, rock guitarist, 45 (drowned)
- January 5 – Burton Lane, composer and lyricist, 84
- January 10 – Kenny Pickett, vocalist (The Creation), 54
- January 18 – Keith Diamond, songwriter, 46
- January 21 – Colonel Tom Parker, manager of Elvis Presley, 87
- January 22
  - Richard Berry, songwriter (notably wrote "Louie Louie"), 61
  - Billy Mackenzie, Scottish vocalist of The Associates, 39 (suicide)
- January 27 – Gerald Marks, American songwriter, 96
- February 10 – Brian Connolly, vocalist (Sweet), 51 (liver failure)
- February 23 – Tony Williams, jazz drummer, 51
- March 3 – Finn Høffding, Danish composer, 97
- March 9 – The Notorious B.I.G., rapper, 24 (shot)
- March 10 – LaVern Baker, R & B singer, 67
- March 17 – Jermaine Stewart, vocalist, 39 (AIDS)
- March 24 – Harold Melvin, soul musician, 57
- April 8 – Laura Nyro, singer-songwriter, 49 (ovarian cancer)
- April 9
  - Mae Boren Axton, songwriter and music promoter, 82
  - Yank Rachell, blues guitarist, 87
- April 10 – Toshiro Mayuzumi, Japanese composer, 68
- April 19 – Eldon Hoke, metal/punk singer and drummer, 39
- May 9 – Willy Hess, Swiss musicologist and composer, 90
- May 11 – Ernie Fields, American trombonist, pianist and bandleader, 93
- May 29 – Jeff Buckley, American singer-songwriter and guitarist, 30 (drowned)
- June 2 – Doc Cheatham, jazz trumpeter, 91
- June 4 – Ronnie Lane, member of The Small Faces, 51 (multiple sclerosis, pneumonia)
- June 7 – Arthur Prysock, jazz singer, 68
- June 16 – John Wolters (Dr Hook), 52 (liver cancer)
- June 19 – Bobby Helms, country singer, 63
- June 20 – Lawrence Payton (The Four Tops), 59
- June 21 – Shintaro Katsu, Japanese actor, singer, producer, and filmmaker, 65 (pharyngeal cancer)
- June 23 – Prince Nico Mbarga, Nigerian highlife musician, 47
- June 26 – Israel Kamakawiwoʻole, Hawaiian musician, 38
- July 5 – Mrs. Elva Miller, American singer, 89
- August 1 – Sviatoslav Richter, pianist, 82
- August 2 – Fela Kuti, Nigerian musician and composer, 58 (Kaposi's sarcoma)
- August 5 – Don Steele, American disc jockey, 61
- August 10 – Conlon Nancarrow, composer, 84
- August 12 – Luther Allison, blues guitarist, 57
- August 16 – Ustad Nusrat Fateh Ali Khan, qawwali singer and world music ambassador, 48
- September 5 – Sir Georg Solti, conductor, 84
- September 8 – Derek Taylor, press agent for The Beatles, 65
- September 17 – Anthony Franchini, Italian American guitarist, 99
- September 18 – Jimmy Witherspoon, blues singer, 77
- September 19 – Rich Mullins, singer, 41
- September 27 – Walter Trampler, German-born American violist, 82
- September 28 – Munir Bashir, musician and oud player, 66–67
- October 5 – Arthur Tracy, singer, 98
- October 12 – John Denver, American folk singer-songwriter and folk rock musician, 53 (air crash)
- October 19 – Glen Buxton, guitarist for the original Alice Cooper Band, 49 (pneumonia)
- October 20 – Henry Vestine, guitarist (Canned Heat), 52
- November 3 – Ronald Barnes, carillonist, 70
- November 6 – Epic Soundtracks, English singer-songwriter, drummer of Swell Maps, Crime and the City Solution and These Immortal Souls, 38
- November 12 – Carlos Surinach, Spanish-American composer and conductor, 82
- November 20 – Robert Palmer, writer, musicologist, clarinetist and producer, 52
- November 22 – Michael Hutchence, singer of INXS, 37 (suicide by hanging)
- December 1 – Stephane Grappelli, French violinist, 89
- December 2 – Michael Hedges, composer and guitarist, 43 (car accident)
- December 16 – Nicolette Larson, pop singer ("Lotta Love"), 45 (cerebral edema)
- December 19 – Jimmy Rogers, blues musician, 73
- December 21 – Amie Comeaux, American singer and actress, 21 (traffic accident)
- December 28 – Henry Barraud, French composer, 97
- December 31 – Floyd Cramer, pianist, 64

== Awards ==
- 1997 Country Music Association Awards
- Eurovision Song Contest 1997: won by Katrina and the Waves (UK) with the song "Love Shine a Light".
- Gospel Music Hall of Fame: Inductees include Gloria Gaither, and Billy Ray Hearn (founder of Myrrh Records).
- Grammy Awards of 1997
- Mercury Music Prize: Awarded to Roni Size/Reprazent for the album New Forms.
- 1997 MTV Video Music Awards
- Rock and Roll Hall of Fame: The following artists are inducted: The (Young) Rascals; the Bee Gees; Buffalo Springfield; Crosby, Stills and Nash; The Jackson 5; Joni Mitchell; and Parliament-Funkadelic.
- 51st Tony Awards

== Charts ==
- List of Billboard Hot 100 number ones of 1997
- 1997 in British music#Charts
- List of Oricon number-one singles of 1997

== See also ==
- 1997 in music (UK)
- Category:Record labels established in 1997
- Triple J Hottest 100, 1997
