= Fiestas and Fiascos =

Studio album by Lifter Puller
- Released: February 8, 2000 (Self-Starter); February 15, 2000 (The Orchard)
- Genre: Post-punk
- Length: 30:47
- Label: The Self-Starter Foundation (PSP 010); The Orchard
- Producer: Dave Gardner and Eric Olsen

Lifter Puller chronology
| The Entertainment and Arts EP (1998) | Fiestas and Fiascos (2000) | Soft Rock (2002) |

Professional ratings
Review scores
| Source | Rating |
|---|---|
| Allmusic | 4.5/5 stars |
| Pitchfork | 3.2/10 (2000); 8.8/10 (2009) |

Fiestas and Fiascos is the final Lifter Puller LP composed of new material and the only album of theirs not included on Soft Rock. The record is much tighter than previous songs, as where the band plays hook-centrically and vocalist Craig Finn sings with more vocal force (shouting at times) than melodicism. The almost exclusively mythological focus of "Fiestas and Fiascos" in many ways foreshadows the approach Finn would take with The Hold Steady, as does the less melodic vocal approach. In addition, the record ends with the burning of the "Nice Nice", bringing the Lifter Puller folklore back to its start.

== Track listing ==
1. "Lonely in a Limousine" – 2:11
2. "Candy's Room" – 1:54
3. "Space Humping $19.99" – 2:45
4. "Manpark" – 2:33
5. "Lake Street Is for Lovers" – 1:06
6. "Nice Nice" – 3:35
7. "Katrina and the K-Hole" – 2:07
8. "Cruised and Accused of Cruising" – 1:37
9. "Touch My Stuff" – 2:36
10. "Lie Down on Landsdowne" – 3:36
11. "Lifter Puller vs. the End of the Evening" – 3:27
12. "The Flex and the Buff Result" – 3:21
