= The Entertainment and Arts =

EP by Lifter Puller
- Released: 1998
- Genre: Post-punk
- Label: Threatening Letters

Lifter Puller chronology
Half Dead and Dynamite (1997)	The Entertainment and Arts (1998)	Fiestas and Fiascos (2000)

The Entertainment and Arts is an EP by Lifter Puller. It was released in 1998 and recorded with Eric Olsen and Dave Gardner at Burr Holland Studio in MPLS.

== Track listing ==
1. Plymouth Rock (0:49)
2. The Candy Machine and My Girlfriend (2:51)
3. Sangre de Stephanie (5:26)
4. Roaming the Foam (3:02)
5. Star Wars Hips (4:06)
6. Let's Get Incredible (4:59)
