= Live! (Huck-A-Bucks album) =

Live album by Huck-A-Bucks
- Released: December 12, 1995
- Recorded: 1995
- Venue: The Ibex, Washington, D.C.
- Genre: Go-go
- Length: 75:37
- Label: Sound by Charlie; Liaison Records
- Producer: Roy Battle

Huck-A-Bucks chronology
Chronic Breakdown (1995)	Live! (1995)	You Betta' Move Somethin'! (1997)

Live! is a live album released by the Washington, D.C.–based go-go band the Huck-A-Bucks on December 12, 1995. The album consists of ten tracks including the singles "Kombat", "The Bud", and the go-go rendition of E-40's "Sprinkle Me".

== Track listing ==
No.	Title	Writer(s)	Length
1.	"Sprinkle"	Earl Stevens; T.M. Stevens	5:38
2.	"It's the Huck-A-Bucks"		5:17
3.	"Start the Party"		6:54
4.	"Get Down"		8:44
5.	"If U Feel Like I Feel"		9:11
6.	"Sexy Girl Contest"		7:52
7.	"The Bud"		7:36
8.	"It's Time"		11:22
9.	"Kombat"		7:32
10.	"The Bud"		5:58
Total length:			75:37

== Personnel ==
Adapted from AllMusic

- Mike Baker – bass guitar
- Blue Eye Darryl – drums
- DeCarlos Cunningham – keyboards
- Rob "R.J" Folson – keyboards
- Sequan Jones – congas, percussion
- Kenny – congas
- Lorenzo – keyboards
- Lamont Ray – percussion, vocals
- Felix Stevenson – drums
- Joseph Timms – rapping, vocals
- Charles Yancy – percussion, vocals
- Roy Battle – engineer, mixing, producer
