= Chronic Breakdown =

Studio album by Huck-A-Bucks
- Released: December 12, 1995
- Genre: Go-go
- Length: 67:06
- Label: Liaison Records
- Producer: Roy Battle

Huck-A-Bucks chronology
Chronic Breakdown (1995)	Live! (1995)

Chronic Breakdown a studio album released by the Washington, D.C.-based go-go band the Huck-A-Bucks on December 12, 1995. This was the band's debut album, and consists of twelve tracks including the song "Sexy Girl" which was sampled by hip-hop recording artist Wale for the 2006 single "Breakdown".

== Track listing ==
No.	Title	Length
1.	"Send a Shot Out"	6:51
2.	"Get It Up"	9:43
3.	"The Congo Drum Mix"	5:20
4.	"Chronic Breakdown"	3:24
5.	"So You Think We Can't Groove"	4:07
6.	"Let's Rock a While"	8:15
7.	"It's Time"	5:17
8.	"Who's Ready...?"	5:16
9.	"Sexy Girl"	4:37
10.	"Be My Lady"	4:49
11.	"Get It Up" (instrumental)	4:45
12.	"Who's Ready...?" (radio version)	4:42
Total length:		67:06

== Personnel ==
Adapted from AllMusic.

- Darryl Arrington – drums
- DeCarlos Cunningham – keyboards
- Rob "R.J." Folson – keyboards
- Sequan Jones – congas, percussion
- Lamont Ray – percussion, vocals
- Felix Stevenson – drums
- Joseph Timms – rapping, vocals
- Charles Yancy – percussion, vocals
- Roy Battle – engineer, producer
