= Palomar (band) =

American indie rock band

- Sarah Brockett & Rachel Warren

Background information
- Origin: Brooklyn, New York, USA
- Genres: Indie, pop, new wave
- Years active: 1998–present
- Labels: The Self-Starter Foundation; Misra Records
- Members: Sarah Brockett; Dale W. Miller; Christina Prostano; Rachel Warren
- Website: Official website

Dale W. Miller & Christina Prostano

Palomar is an indie rock band out of Brooklyn, New York.

== Profile ==
The band originally formed in 1998. Rachel Warren is the only original member still in the band, though Rachel and Christina had been in the band Trixie Belden together before Palomar. Sarah and Dale have been in Palomar since making their third record. They have completed national U.S. tours every year since 2003, including a tour shared with nationally renowned indie bands Mates of State, Spoon (band), Luna (1990s American band), The Wrens, Nada Surf, etc. Their music has heard praise from various magazines including Pitchfork Media and The Austin Chronicle. The blend of rock music and melodic female vocals create a simple and driving pop sound reminiscent of Rilo Kiley. After four albums, two on Brooklyn indie The Self-Starter Foundation, one on Kindercore Vinyl, and All Things, Forests was released by Misra Records on March 20, 2007. Their name is taken from the Palomar Observatory in San Diego County, California.

== Discography ==
=== Albums ===
- Palomar (1999)
- Palomar II (2002, The Self-Starter Foundation)
- Palomar III: Revenge of Palomar (2004, The Self-Starter Foundation)
- All Things, Forests (2007, Misra Records)
- Sense & Antisense (2012)

=== EPs ===
- Palomar 3.5 (2005)
