= The Self-Starter Foundation =

The Self-Starter Foundation is a New York City-based independent record label founded in 1994 by Chris Newmyer. Artists who have released records on the label include Enon, Les Savy Fav, Lifter Puller, and Palomar.
