= Lifter Puller (album) =

Studio album by Lifter Puller
- Released: April 18, 1997
- Genre: Post-punk
- Length: 47:44
- Label: Skene Records

Lifter Puller chronology
Lifter Puller (1997)	Half Dead and Dynamite (1997)

Lifter Puller is the debut album by the Minneapolis band of the same name. It was released on April 18, 1997 by Skene, and came out a month later in Italy. The album introduced a number of characters and themes central to later Lifter Puller releases, despite being characterized by a markedly inchoate version of their later sound. According to the Village Voice, it was, in fact "the one time they ever sounded like a generic indie-rock band" .

== Track listing ==
1. Double Straps - (4:09)
2. Bloomington - (2:42)
3. Star Wars Hips (fast version) - (3:06)
4. Bruce Bender - (2:29)
5. Lazy Eye - (7:36)
6. The Mezzanine Gypoff - (2:39)
7. Jeep Beep Suite - (3:26)
8. Rental - (5:33)
9. Solid Gold Sole - (2:52)
10. Sublet - (2:59)
11. Summer House - (3:36)
12. Mission Viejo - (3:07)
13. Mono - (3:30)
