= Half Dead and Dynamite =

Studio album by Lifter Puller
- Released: October 21, 1997
- Recorded: Summer 1997
- Genre: Post-punk
- Length: 38:10
- Label: No Alternative
- Producer: Mike Wisti

Lifter Puller chronology
Lifter Puller (1997)	Half Dead and Dynamite (1997)	The Entertainment and Arts EP (1998)

Professional ratings
Review scores
Source	Rating
AllMusic	4/5 stars
Pitchfork Media	8.2/10

Half Dead and Dynamite is an album by the Minnesota indie rock band Lifter Puller, released in 1997. The album was reissued in 2009.

== Critical reception ==
City Pages wrote that singer Craig Finn "is a wry and bizarre punk poet, relating obscure tales of high-school depravity, boredom, and violence that unravel as teenage escape songs written from a semi-female perspective."

== Track listing ==
1. "To Live and Die in LBI" – 3:13
2. "I Like the Lights" – 3:33
3. "Sherman City" – 3:31
4. "Naussau Coliseum" – 6:13
5. "Kool NYC" – 1:42
6. "Half Dead and Dynamite" – 3:21
7. "The Bears" – 1:55
8. "Hardware" – 2:24
9. "The Gin and the Sour Defeat" – 3:51
10. "Viceburgh" – 6:04
11. "Rock for Lite Brite" – 2:23
