= Lifter Puller =

American indie rock band

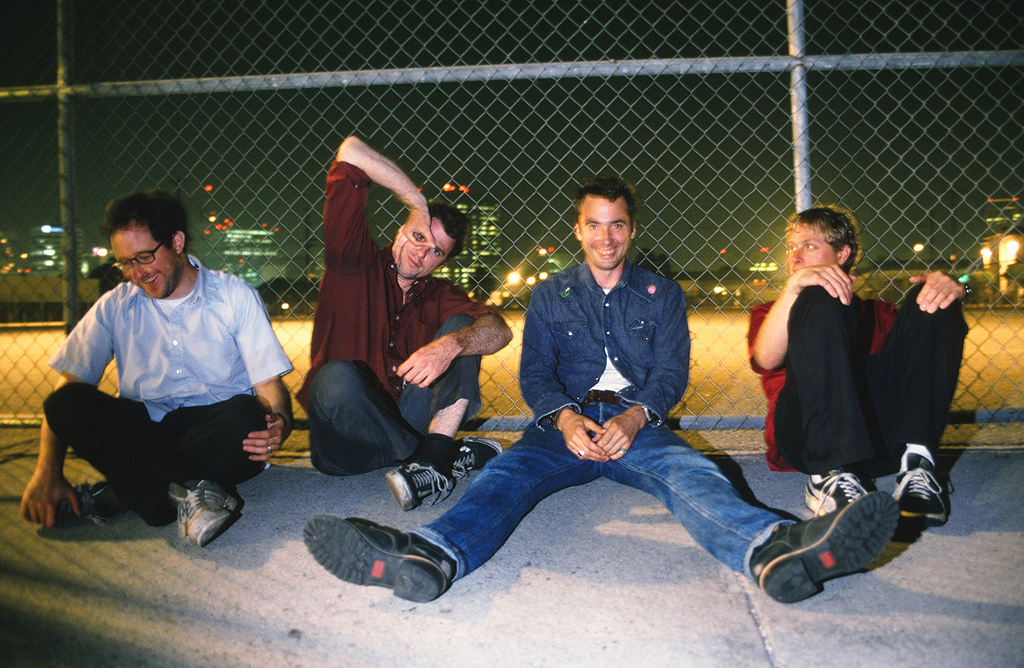

Background information
- Origin: Minneapolis, United States
- Genres: Indie rock, post-punk
- Years active: 1994–2000, 2002, 2003, 2015, 2016
- Labels: Skene, No Alternative, Threatening Letters, Frenchkiss Records, The Self-Starter Foundation
- Members: Craig Finn; Steve Barone; Tad Kubler; Dan Monick
- Past members: Tommy Roach; Dave Gerlach
- Website: lftrpllr.com

Lifter Puller, or LFTR PLLR, was an American indie rock band from the Twin Cities and the Boston area between 1994 and 2000. Their music is considered innovative, with its angular riffs and a synth-infused sound that predated the 1980s revival trends of the early 2000s.

The band released three LPs and an EP before breaking up in the summer of 2000. In 2002, the compilation Soft Rock was released, featuring nearly every song in the Lifter Puller catalogue, excluding their final album, Fiestas and Fiascos, and the songs "Prescription Sunglasses", "Emperor", "Slips Backwards," and "Bitchy Christmas," as well as the original version of "Nassau Colisseum," the b-side to the "Slips Backwards" single.

After several years out of print, all of the original Lifter Puller records were re-issued digitally with bonus tracks in December 2009. These reissues were accompanied by a limited-edition book entitled Lifter Puller vs. The End of.

Singer/guitarist Craig Finn and bassist Tad Kubler are now members of The Hold Steady, which continues to explore some of the lyrical themes established by Lifter Puller while eschewing the art punk sound of the prior band in favor of a sound more akin to classic-rock revivalism.

In 2003, the band reunited for three sold out shows for the opening of the Triple Rock Social Club in their hometown of Minneapolis.

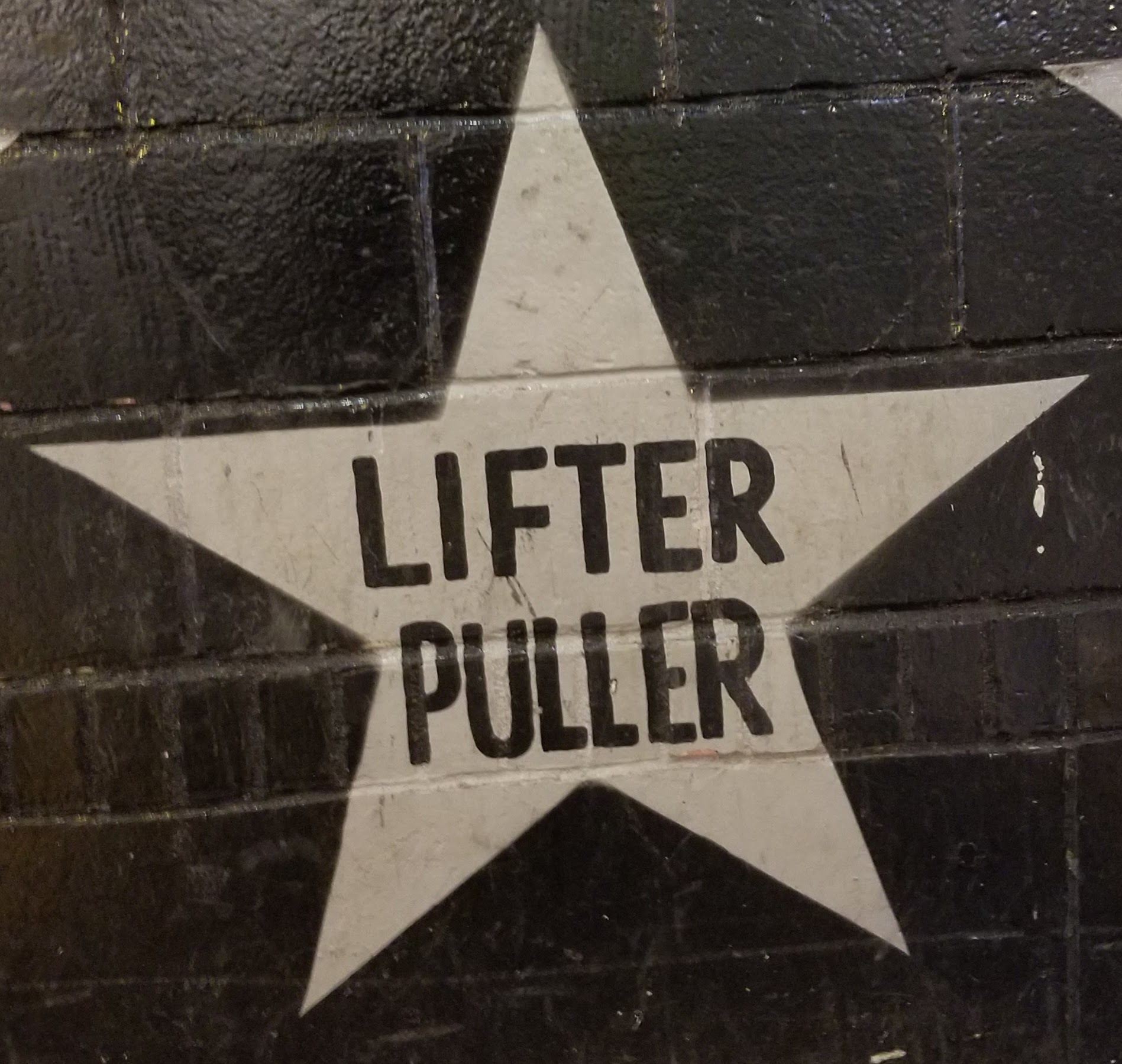
Lifter Puller's star on the outside mural of the Minneapolis nightclub First Avenue

Lifter Puller has been honored with a star on the outside mural of the Minneapolis nightclub First Avenue, recognizing performers that have played sold-out shows or have otherwise demonstrated a major contribution to the culture at the iconic venue. Receiving a star "might be the most prestigious public honor an artist can receive in Minneapolis," according to journalist Steve Marsh. Kubler and Finn's subsequent group The Hold Steady also has a star.

The band reunited on July 4, 2015, in Minneapolis at the Triple Rock Social Club at Dillinger Four's annual "D4th of July" event for an eight-song set. On September 2, 2016, they reunited again to support Atmosphere at Red Rocks Amphitheater in Morrison, Colorado. On December 3, 2016, Lifter Puller opened for The Hold Steady at The Brooklyn Bowl on the final of a four-night series of shows commemorating the tenth anniversary of the album Boys and Girls In America.

== Members ==
Final band line-up:

- Craig Finn — lead vocals, guitar
- Steve Barone — guitar, keyboards
- Dan Monick — drums
- Tad Kubler — bass guitar (1998–2000)

Past members:

- Tommy Roach — bass guitar (1994–1998)
- Dave Gerlach— drums (1994–1996)

== Discography ==
=== Albums ===
- Lifter Puller — 1997
- Half Dead and Dynamite — 1997
- Fiestas and Fiascos — 2000

=== Singles ===
- "Prescription Sunglasses b/w Emperor" — 1995
- "Slips Backwards b/w Nassau Coliseum" — 1995
- "The Mezzanine Gyp b/w Star Wars Hips" — 1996
- "Bay City Rolling" — 2001
- "4-Dix" — 2001

=== EPs ===
- The Entertainment and Arts — 1998

=== Compilations ===
- Soft Rock — 2002
- Lifter Puller Vs. the End of — 2009
