= Huck-A-Bucks =

1990s Washington D.C.-based go-go band

- Origin: Washington, D.C., U.S.
- Genres: Go-go
- Years active: 1990s
- Labels: Liaison Records

The Huck-a-Bucks was a Washington, D.C.–based go-go band formed in the early 1990s. The band was active in the Washington metropolitan area, producing numerous songs in the Washington music scene and several hits nationwide, including the single "The Bud". The band members consisted of Joseph "Lil Joey" Timms rapping/singing, Charles "Ricky" Yancy, Lamont "Ray-Ray" Ray playing percussions, Rob "RJ" Folson, DeCarlos Cunningham, keyboardist Lorenzo Wiliams, drummer Felix Stevenson, and Sequan "Quan" Jones playing congas and percussions.

== Discography ==
=== Studio albums ===
- Chronic Breakdown (Liaison, 1995)
- You Betta' Move Somethin'! (Sound By Charlie, 1997)

=== Live albums ===
- Live! (Liaison, 1995)

=== Songs ===
- "Sexy Girl" (1995)
- "The Bud" (1995)
- "Kombat" (1995)
- "Sprinkle" (1995)
