= You Betta' Move Somethin'! =

Studio album by Huck-A-Bucks
- Released: April 15, 1997
- Genre: Go-go
- Length: 137:57
- Label: Sound by Charlie; Liaison Records
- Producer: Roy Battle

Huck-A-Bucks chronology
Live! (1995)	You Betta' Move Somethin'! (1997)

You Betta' Move Somethin'! is a studio album released by Washington, D.C.–based go-go band the Huck-A-Bucks on April 15, 1997. The album consist of ten tracks including the single "Bomp Bomp (You Betta' Move Somethin'!)".

== Track listing ==
Disc 1
No.	Title	Length
1.	"I Got It Bad" (Roy Battle/Huck-A-Bucks)	5:20
2.	"Bomp Bomp (You Betta' Move Somethin'!)" (Roy Battle/Huck-A-Bucks)	12:07
3.	"I Want One" (Roy Battle/Huck-A-Bucks)	11:34
4.	"Bud Flava" (Roy Battle/Huck-A-Bucks)	2:05
5.	"Gimmie Those Roto-Toms!" (Roy Battle/Huck-A-Bucks)	9:25
6.	"H.B. Hold It Down" (Roy Battle/Huck-A-Bucks)	7:22
7.	"Bend Those Knees" (Roy Battle/Huck-A-Bucks)	6:00
8.	"Buck Down"	6:40
9.	"Darkside 1" (Roy Battle/Huck-A-Bucks)	0:47
10.	"Darkside 2" (Roy Battle/Huck-A-Bucks)	0:26
Total length:		75:37

Disc 2 (Live)
No.	Title	Length
1.	"Huck-A-Bucks" (Live P.A.)	61:46
Total length:		61:46

== Personnel ==
Adapted from AllMusic.

- Sequan Jones – congas, timbales
- A.J. Mezikpih – rapping, vocals
- Lamont Ray – percussion, vocals
- Felix Stevenson – drums
- Joseph Timms – vocals
- Charles Yancy – percussion, vocals
- Roy Battle – engineer, mixing, producer
- Walt Fletcher – assistant engineer
