= Gala =

Gala may refer to:

== Music ==
- Gala (album), a 1990 album by the English alternative rock band Lush
- Gala (singer), Italian singer and songwriter
- Gala – The Collection, a 2016 album by Sarah Brightman
- GALA Choruses, an association of LGBT choral groups
- Gala, a 1986 album by The Walker Brothers
- "Gala" (song), a 2025 song by XG

== Organizations and brands ==
- GALA (Gay and Lesbian Acceptance), a Missouri non-profit organization for LGBT individuals connected with the Community of Christ
- Gala (supermarket), an Irish convenience store chain
- Gala Coral Group, a betting shop and bingo hall operator based in the United Kingdom
- Gala Inc., a Japanese holding company
- Gala RFC, a rugby club in Galashiels, Scotland
- Gala TV, a television channel
- "Gala", a nickname of Turkish football club Galatasaray S.K.
- Girls Academic Leadership Academy, a public 6-12 school for girls in Los Angeles
- GALA Queer Archive, a South African organization that documents LGBTQ history

== People ==
- Gala (given name), the given name
- Gala (king), king of the Massylii of eastern Numidia
- Gala (singer), Italian singer/songwriter
- Gala Dalí (1894-1982), wife of French poet Paul Éluard and Catalan painter Salvador Dalí
- Gala Aleksić (born 1969), Serbian actress
- Gala Varo, Mexican drag queen
- Antonio Gala (1930–2023), Spanish poet and novelist
- Gabe Gala (born 1989), Nigerian-born Canadian soccer player
- Rosa Gala (born 1995), Angolan basketball player

== Places ==
- Gala, Iran, a village in East Azerbaijan Province, Iran
- Gala, Tibet, a village
- Gala, Virginia, an unincorporated community in the United States
- Gala, Croatia, a village near Sinj
- Puerto Gala, a hamlet in southern Chile
- Shorthand for Galashiels, a town in Scotland

== Others ==
- Gala (apple), a type of apple grown particularly in New Zealand
- Gala (board game), a board game played in Thailand and Myanmar
- Gala (festivity), a festival
- Gala (film), a 1982 Canadian documentary film
- Gala (literary prize), awarded by the Tbilisi City Assembly, Georgia
- Gala (magazine), a French magazine
- Gala (potato)
- Gala (priests), the lamenting priests of the Sumerian goddess Inanna
- Gala (Victoria), a historic homestead near Lismore, Victoria, Australia
- Gala Brand, a fictional character of the James Bond novel Moonraker (did not appear in the film version)
- Gala (γάλα), a Greek word meaning milk; see Galaxy § Etymology
- Swimming gala, an amateur swimming competition
- Galà, a 2022 educational mobile game developed by Kendikorp

== See also ==
- Gala Group (disambiguation)
- Durham Miners' Gala, an annual gathering and labour festival held in Durham, England
- Galah, a cockatoo native to Australia
- Galas, Greek mythological figure
- Galla Placidia, Roman empress, daughter of Emperor Theodosius the Great
- Gela (disambiguation)
