= Ultratop 40 number-one hits of 1996 =

This is a list of songs that topped the Belgian Walloon (francophone) Ultratop 40 in 1996.

Date	Title	Artist
January 6	"Gangsta's Paradise"	Coolio featuring L.V.
January 13	"Gangsta's Paradise"	Coolio featuring L.V.
January 20	"Gangsta's Paradise"	Coolio featuring L.V.
January 27	"Gangsta's Paradise"	Coolio featuring L.V.
February 3	"Gangsta's Paradise"	Coolio featuring L.V.
February 10	"Gangsta's Paradise"	Coolio featuring L.V.
February 17	"Gangsta's Paradise"	Coolio featuring L.V.
February 24	"Gangsta's Paradise"	Coolio featuring L.V.
March 2	"Gangsta's Paradise"	Coolio featuring L.V.
March 9	"Spaceman"	Babylon Zoo
March 16	"Spaceman"	Babylon Zoo
March 23	"Children"	Robert Miles
March 30	"Children"	Robert Miles
April 6	"Children"	Robert Miles
April 13	"Children"	Robert Miles
April 20	"Soirée disco"	Boris
April 27	"Soirée disco"	Boris
May 4	"Soirée disco"	Boris
May 11	"Soirée disco"	Boris
May 18	"Soirée disco"	Boris
May 25	"Soirée disco"	Boris
June 1	"Soirée disco"	Boris
June 8	"Con te partirò"	Andrea Bocelli
June 15	"Con te partirò"	Andrea Bocelli
June 22	"Con te partirò"	Andrea Bocelli
June 29	"Con te partirò"	Andrea Bocelli
July 6	"Con te partirò"	Andrea Bocelli
July 13	"Macarena"	Los del Río
July 20	"Macarena"	Los del Río
July 27	"Macarena"	Los del Río
August 3	"Macarena"	Los del Río
August 10	"Killing Me Softly"	Fugees
August 17	"Killing Me Softly"	Fugees
August 24	"Killing Me Softly"	Fugees
August 31	"Killing Me Softly"	Fugees
September 7	"Killing Me Softly"	Fugees
September 14	"Killing Me Softly"	Fugees
September 21	"Killing Me Softly"	Fugees
September 28	"Killing Me Softly"	Fugees
October 5	"Wannabe"	Spice Girls
October 12	"Wannabe"	Spice Girls
October 19	"Wannabe"	Spice Girls
October 26	"Aïcha"	Khaled
November 2	"Aïcha"	Khaled
November 9	"Aïcha"	Khaled
November 16	"Aïcha"	Khaled
November 23	"Aïcha"	Khaled
November 30	"Aïcha"	Khaled
December 7	"Freed from Desire"	Gala
December 14	"Freed from Desire"	Gala
December 21	"Freed from Desire"	Gala
December 28	"Freed from Desire"	Gala

== See also ==
- 1996 in music
