= List of number-one singles of 1996 (France) =

This is a list of the French SNEP Top 100 Singles number-ones of 1996.

== Number-ones by week ==
=== Singles Chart ===
Week	Date	Artist	Single
1	January 6	Coolio featuring L.V.	"Gangsta's Paradise"
2	January 13	Coolio featuring L.V.	"Gangsta's Paradise"
3	January 20	Coolio featuring L.V.	"Gangsta's Paradise"
4	January 27	Coolio featuring L.V.	"Gangsta's Paradise"
5	February 3	Coolio featuring L.V.	"Gangsta's Paradise"
6	February 10	Coolio featuring L.V.	"Gangsta's Paradise"
7	February 17	Coolio featuring L.V.	"Gangsta's Paradise"
8	February 24	Ophélie Winter	"Dieu m'a donné la foi"
9	March 2	Coolio feat. L.V.	"Gangsta's Paradise"
10	March 9	Babylon Zoo	"Spaceman"
11	March 16	Boris	"Soirée disco"
12	March 23	Robert Miles	"Children"
13	March 30	Robert Miles	"Children"
14	April 6	Robert Miles	"Children"
15	April 13	Robert Miles	"Children"
16	April 20	Robert Miles	"Children"
17	April 27	Robert Miles	"Children"
18	May 4	Robert Miles	"Children"
19	May 11	Robert Miles	"Children"
20	May 18	Robert Miles	"Children"
21	May 25	Robert Miles	"Children"
22	June 1	Robert Miles	"Children"
23	June 8	Mark Snow	"The X-Files"
24	June 15	Los Del Rio	"Macarena"
25	June 22	Los Del Rio	"Macarena"
26	June 29	Los Del Rio	"Macarena"
27	July 6	Los Del Rio	"Macarena"
28	July 13	Carrapicho	"Tic, Tic Tac"
29	July 20	Carrapicho	"Tic, Tic Tac"
30	July 27	Carrapicho	"Tic, Tic Tac"
31	August 3	Los Del Rio	"Macarena"
32	August 10	Los Del Rio	"Macarena"
33	August 17	Los Del Rio	"Macarena"
34	August 24	Fugees	"Killing Me Softly"
35	August 31	Fugees	"Killing Me Softly"
36	September 7	Fugees	"Killing Me Softly"
37	September 14	Fugees	"Killing Me Softly"
38	September 21	Fugees	"Killing Me Softly"
39	September 28	Spice Girls	"Wannabe"
40	October 5	Spice Girls	"Wannabe"
41	October 12	Spice Girls	"Wannabe"
42	October 19	Khaled	"Aïcha"
43	October 26	Gala	"Freed from Desire"
44	November 2	Gala	"Freed from Desire"
45	November 9	Gala	"Freed from Desire"
46	November 16	Gala	"Freed from Desire"
47	November 23	Gala	"Freed from Desire"
48	November 30	Gala	"Freed from Desire"
49	December 7	Gala	"Freed from Desire"
50	December 14	Gala	"Freed from Desire"
51	December 21	Gala	"Freed from Desire"
52	December 28	Gala	"Freed from Desire"

== See also ==
- 1996 in music
- List of number-one singles in France
- List of artists who reached number one on the French Singles Chart
