= Ultratop 50 number-one hits of 1997 =

These hits topped the Ultratop 50 in 1997.

Date	Artist	Title
January 4	Robert Miles & Maria Nayler	One & One
January 11	Gala	Freed from Desire
January 18	Gala	Freed from Desire
January 25	Gala	Freed from Desire
February 1	Gala	Freed from Desire
February 8	Gala	Freed from Desire
February 15	No Doubt	Don't Speak
February 22	No Doubt	Don't speak
March 1	No Doubt	Don't speak
March 8	No Doubt	Don't speak
March 15	No Doubt	Don't speak
March 22	No Doubt	Don't speak
March 29	Gala	Let a Boy Cry
April 5	Gala	Let a Boy Cry
April 12	Gala	Let a Boy Cry
April 19	Gala	Let a Boy Cry
April 26	Funky Green Dogs	Fired Up!
May 3	Funky Green Dogs	Fired Up!
May 10	Funky Green Dogs	Fired Up!
May 17	Funky Green Dogs	Fired Up!
May 24	Funky Green Dogs	Fired Up!
May 31	Jantje Smit	Ik zing dit lied voor jou alleen
June 7	Jantje Smit	Ik zing dit lied voor jou alleen
June 14	Sash!	Ecuador
June 21	Sash!	Ecuador
June 28	Sash!	Ecuador
July 5	Sash!	Ecuador
July 12	Hanson	MMMBop
July 19	Hanson	Mmmbop
July 26	Hanson	Mmmbop
August 2	Hanson	Mmmbop
August 9	Puff Daddy & Faith Evans & 112	I'll Be Missing You
August 16	Puff Daddy & Faith Evans & 112	I'll be missing you
August 23	Puff Daddy & Faith Evans & 112	I'll be missing you
August 30	Puff Daddy & Faith Evans & 112	I'll be missing you
September 6	Wes	Alane
September 13	Puff Daddy & Faith Evans & 112	I'll be missing you
September 20	Elton John	Something About the Way You Look Tonight / Candle in the Wind 1997
September 27	Elton John	Something about the way you look tonight / Candle in the wind 1997
October 4	Elton John	Something about the way you look tonight / Candle in the wind 1997
October 11	Elton John	Something about the way you look tonight / Candle in the wind 1997
October 18	Elton John	Something about the way you look tonight / Candle in the wind 1997
October 25	Elton John	Something about the way you look tonight / Candle in the wind 1997
November 1	Elton John	Something about the way you look tonight / Candle in the wind 1997
November 8	Aqua	Barbie Girl
November 15	Aqua	Barbie Girl
November 22	Aqua	Barbie Girl
November 29	Aqua	Barbie Girl
December 6	Aqua	Barbie Girl
December 13	Aqua	Barbie Girl
December 20	Aqua	Barbie Girl
December 27	Aqua	Barbie Girl

== See also ==
- 1997 in music
