= Come into My Life =

Come into My Life may refer to:

- Come into My Life (Joyce Sims album), 1987 including title track
- Come into My Life (Gala album), 1997
  - "Come into My Life" (Gala song), 1997
- Come into My Life (Jermaine Jackson album), 1973
- "Come into My Life" (Laura Branigan and Joe Esposito song), 1988
