= Rušinović =

Rušinović is a surname of Croatian origin. Notable people with the surname include:

- Goran Rušinović (born 1968), Croatian film director and screenwriter
- Nikola Rušinović (1908–1993), Croatian-American physician and diplomat

== See also ==
- Mark Russinovich (born 1966), Spanish-American software engineer and author
