= Indiiana =

Dutch-Dominican singer

- Born: Indiana; August 28, 1997 (age 28)
- Occupations: singer; songwriter
- Years active: 2016–present
- Musical career
- Genres: Pop; dance-pop; House; Dance
- Instrument: Vocals
- Label: Planet Punk Music

Indiana Buenting (born August 28, 1997), known professionally as Indiiana, is a Dutch-Dominican singer and songwriter, best known for featured appearances in the songs of Drenchill and Heimlich.

== Career ==
Indiiana's debut was as featured singer on "Sharks", created with Heimlich, which made it into 2 German charts: Dance-Charts and Deutsche Dj Playlist.

The second single of Indiiana was "Hey Hey" (a song by Drenchill with a guest performance by Indiiana), published by Sony Music. It came to German Dance-Charts with the highest position number 63. He was also on the Deutsche Dj Playlist list, where he was on position 10. Then Drenchill continued his collaboration with Indiiana.

Their next song was "Freed from Desire" (a cover of the single of the same name from Gala Rizzatto). In addition to the already mentioned lists and it was at number 1 on the Polish music charts AirPlay – Top list (it was the most popular single by Drenchill or Indiiana in Poland) and at number 4 on the Russian list (by Tophit).

In 2019 she recorded the song "Never Never" with Drenchill. It was the artists' most popular single in France and Belgium – she made it to the top of the Polish, Russian, German and French charts and to the tip of both Belgian charts (Ultratop 50 Singles from Flanders and Ultratop 50 Singles from Wallonia). This year she also appeared in the single We R Saints in the single "Shelter Me", but was unsuccessful.

In 2020 she recorded her next single – "Forever Summer" – with Drenchill. She was ranked 9th on the Polish list, 503rd in Russia, and he also made it onto two German lists: 3rd and 5th.

She also appeared in the single Nora & Chris and Perfect Pitch under the title "Staring at the sun". This song did not gain much popularity either.

== Discography ==
=== Singles ===
==== As main artist ====
Title	Year	Album
"Mystery"	2021	Non-album singles
"Blurry"	2021	Non-album singles
"River"	2021	Non-album singles

==== As featured artist ====
Title	Year	Peak position						Certifications	Album
Title	Year	BEL (Fla)	BEL (Wal)	FRA	POL	CIS		Certifications	Album
Title	Year	BEL (Fla)	BEL (Wal)	FRA	POL	Radio	Radio & YouTube	Certifications	Album
"Sharks" (Heimlich, featuring: Indiiana)	2016	–	–	–	–	–	–		Non-album singles
"Hey Hey" (Drenchill, featuring: Indiiana)	2018	–	–	–	–	–	–		Non-album singles
"Freed from Desire" (Drenchill, featuring: Indiiana)	2018	–	–	–	1	4	7	ZPAV: 3× Platinum	Non-album singles
"Never Never" (Drenchill, featuring: Indiiana)	2019	Tip	Tip	115	8	103	114	ZPAV: Platinum	Non-album singles
"Shelter Me" (We R Saints, featuring: Indiana oraz Fya Tune)	2019	–	–	–	–	–	–		Non-album singles
"Forever Summer" (Drenchill, featuring: Indiiana)	2020	–	–	–	3	503	–		Non-album singles
"Staring at the sun" (Nora & Chris and Perfect Pitch, featuring: Indiiana)	2020	–	–	–	–	–	–		Non-album singles
„Paradise" (Drenchill, featuring: Indiiana)	2021	–	–	–	–	–	–		Non-album singles
„What You Say" (Drenchill, featuring: Indiiana)		–	–	–	–	–	–		Non-album singles
"—" denotes a recording that did not chart or was not released in that territory.

=== Music videos ===
Title	Year	Director	Ref.
As featured artist
„Hey Hey”	2020	unknown	
„Freed from Desire”	2021	unknown	
„Never Never”	2021	Benjamin Diedering	
„Forever Summer”	2021	unknown	
„Paradise”	2021	unknown	
„What You Say”	2021	unknown	
