= Gela (disambiguation) =

Gela is a city in the south of Sicily, Italy.

Gela may also refer to:

- Gela (album), by Baker Boy, 2021
- Gela (moth), a genus of moth
- Gela (river), a river in the city

== Other uses ==
- Gela Calcio, an Italian football club based in Gela
- Gela language, spoken in the Solomon Islands
- Gela, Nepal, a village development committee

== See also ==
- Gêla, a village in Tibet, China
- Gala (disambiguation)
