= JCS =

JCS may refer to:

== Arts and entertainment ==
- Jesus Christ Superstar, a 1970 rock opera
- Jimmie's Chicken Shack, an American alt rock band
- Jazz Creation Station, the level editor for 1998 game Jazz Jackrabbit 2
- JCS (band), a Filipino trio featuring Stefano Mori
- JCS - Criminal Psychology (also known as Jim Can't Swim), a true crime YouTube channel about criminal interrogations.

== Publications ==
- Journal of Cell Science, a British biweekly, first published 1853
- Journal of Consciousness Studies, an American quarterly, since 1994
- Journal of Croatian Studies, published irregularly since 1960
- Journal of Cuneiform Studies, an American assyriological annual since 1947

== Schools ==
- Joane Cardinal-Schubert High School, Calgary, Canada
- Judah Christian School, Champaign, Illinois, US
- Julian Charter School, Julian, California, US

== Other uses ==
- Jamaican Country Sign Language, an indigenous language isolate
- Joint Chiefs of Staff (disambiguation), several countries' military leadership
- Judicial Correction Services, a probation company of the Southeastern US
