= Megalotica aphoristis =

Scientific classification
- Kingdom: Animalia
- Phylum: Arthropoda
- Class: Insecta
- Order: Lepidoptera
- Family: Geometridae
- Genus: Megalotica
- Species: M. aphoristis

Binomial name
- Megalotica aphoristis (Meyrick, 1899)

Synonyms
- Hydriomena aphoristis Meyrick, 1899

Species of moth

Megalotica aphoristis is a moth of the family Geometridae. It was first described by Edward Meyrick in 1899. It is endemic to the island of Hawaii.

It has a bronzy-brown coloration.

Robert Cyril Layton Perkins (1913) noted that this species has been recorded flying during the day and has habits rather similar to those of Megalotica holombra.
