= Dragutin Kamber =

Croatian Jesuit priest (1901–1969)

- Dragutin Kamber

Grand Prefect of Doboj
- In office May 1941 – August 1941

Personal details
- Born: 9 December 1901 Ruda, Kingdom of Dalmatia, Austro-Hungary
- Died: 20 June 1969 (aged 67) Toronto, Ontario, Canada
- Party: Ustaše
- Education: Pontifical Croatian College of St. Jerome
- Profession: Jesuit priest

Military service
- Allegiance: Independent State of Croatia
- Branch/service: Croatian Armed Forces
- Years of service: 1941–1945
- Rank: Lieutenant colonel
- Battles/wars: World War II in Yugoslavia

Dragutin Kamber (9 December 1901 – 20 June 1969) was a Croatian Jesuit priest and Ustaše functionary who served as the Grand Prefect of Doboj and later as the chaplain of the Croatian Armed Forces in the Axis puppet state known as the Independent State of Croatia (NDH) during World War II. In 1941, he oversaw the mass arrests and internment of Serbs in Doboj, many of whom were interrogated in his house before being killed in its basement. According to the historian Robert B. McCormick, Kamber was responsible for the deaths of hundreds of Serbs during this period.

As the NDH collapsed in May 1945, Kamber fled to Austria and then to Italy, where he recruited for the priest Krunoslav Draganović's ratline, which was used to smuggle former Axis officials out of post-war Europe. In 1947, the Yugoslav government issued a warrant for Kamber's arrest. He later immigrated to the United States under the name Charles Kamber, serving as a parish priest in Gary, Indiana, and Lynch, Nebraska, and became a naturalized American citizen. In 1958, he testified as a defense witness at the deportation hearings of the NDH's former Minister of Internal Affairs, Andrija Artuković, who in the post-war years had settled in Los Angeles. In 1961, Kamber was appointed as the parish priest of Our Lady Queen of Croatia Church in Toronto, and oversaw its reconstruction after it was destroyed in a fire the following year. He lived in Toronto until his death in 1969. He is the namesake of Father Kamber Park located on the grounds of the Church of the Croatian Martyrs in Mississauga, Ontario.

== Early life ==
Dragutin Kamber was born in the village of Ruda, near Sinj, on 9 December 1901. He completed his secondary education at the Archbishop's Seminary in Travnik in 1922, was ordained a priest in 1925 and graduated in theology and philosophy in Sarajevo in 1926. Afterwards, he served as the prefect of the Napredak boarding school in Sarajevo and a catechist in the city's St. Augustine Elementary School. As the editor of Katolički tjednik (Catholic Weekly) from 1926 to 1928, he supported Catholic Action against the Croatian Popular Party. He was a member of the Jesuit Order.

After he ran afoul of the Yugoslav authorities in 1928, the Archbishop of Sarajevo, Ivan Šarić, dispatched Kamber to the Pontifical Croatian College of St. Jerome in Rome, from which he received his doctorate in 1931. His doctoral thesis dealt with the conversion of Orthodox Christians to Catholicism. Returning to Sarajevo in 1932, Kamber worked as a catechist at the teachers' college in Sarajevo and as a parish priest in the village of Vidovice, near Orašje, in northern Bosnia. In 1933, he was named the editor of the Catholic daily Narod (The People). The same year, he was appointed as a parish priest in Doboj, a position he would hold until 1941. Due to his Croatian nationalist views, he again clashed with the authorities and was sentenced to twenty days' imprisonment and a lifetime ban from holding public office.

== World War II ==
According to the historian Mark Biondich, Kamber joined the fascist, Croatian nationalist Ustaše movement in 1941. However, according to a subsequent indictment issued by the Yugoslav government, he had been a member of the Ustaše since 1936. Following the Axis invasion of Yugoslavia in April 1941, he euphorically welcomed the establishment of the puppet state known as the Independent State of Croatia (Croatian: Nezavisna država Hrvatska; NDH), writing in 1945: "The creation of the NDH was greeted by the enormous majority of Croats with indescribable delight." He continued:

I doubt you could have found 1 per cent of Croats who did not approve of it to the bottom of their souls. [Ustaše leader] [Ante] Pavelić was the hero of the day, the new and only programme, the realiser of ancient desires, the hope and guarantee of future days, the avenger of a tortured past, an almost mystical being, a minor demi-god, the greatest Croat of all time, the most beloved and respected being besides whom Tomislav, Starčević, the Radićs (Note: Stjepan and Antun Radić.) (not to mention Maček) paled, just as stars pale beside the sun.

In the weeks following the NDH's establishment, after it was announced that Banja Luka would be turned into Croatia's new capital and that the Italian Prince Aimone would be declared King of Croatia, Kamber wrote a letter to Pavelić commending these as wise decisions. In May 1941, he was appointed as the Grand Prefect of Doboj. In this capacity, he was subordinated directly to Jure Francetić, the principal commissioner for Bosnia and Herzegovina. During this time, Kamber exercised total political control over Doboj and its surroundings. One of his first official acts was to establish a concentration camp. He subsequently oversaw the mass arrest and internment of Serbs, especially members of the intelligentsia, such as teachers and priests. Many of the victims were first brought for interrogation to Kamber's house and were subsequently killed on his orders in its basement. He also supervised the rollout of Ustaše race laws in the district, ordering that Jews were to wear yellow armbands and Serbs were to wear white ones. Recalling this period, Kamber later observed, "The degree of patriotism was measured according to the number of slaughtered Jews and Serbs." The historian Robert B. McCormick estimates that Kamber "sent hundreds of Serbs to their deaths."

In a Novi list article dated 16 August 1941, Kamber argued that the Nazis were fighters for "political and social justice" and builders of the "foundation of a happy world for future generations". In the autumn of 1941, he was appointed as a parish priest in Sarajevo. He was later appointed as the chief military chaplain of Bosnia and Herzegovina. In an April 1942 article marking the first anniversary of the NDH's establishment, Kamber declared, "I will point out that we, Croatian Catholic priests, have in the overwhelming majority belonged to that group of people who have been preparing the coming of an independent Croatia." In April 1944, he wrote an essay titled Izbjegličko pitanje ("The Refugee Question"), in which he presented Muslim refugees arriving in Sarajevo as a grave threat "who had emerged from the lowest depths of cultural and moral standards" and argued for their removal. The Ustaše police reported that the essay had caused unease among Sarajevo's Muslim community and stirred up anxieties about the regime's long-term intentions towards the puppet state's Muslim population.

From 1944, Kamber served as the pastor of the 1st Croatian Shock Division in Zagreb and director of the educational department of the Poglavnik's Bodyguard Corps (Croatian: Poglavnikov tjelesni zdrug), Pavelić's praetorian guard. In early 1945, he was appointed as the chaplain of the Croatian Armed Forces and promoted to the rank of lieutenant colonel.

== Exile and later years ==
In May 1945, Kamber retreated to Austria with what remained of the Croatian Armed Forces. Afterwards, he ended up in Rome, where he wrote the book Slom NDH ("The Collapse of the NDH"). In Genoa, he recruited Monsignor Karlo Petranović to help facilitate the priest Krunoslav Draganović's ratline, which was used to smuggle former Axis officials out of post-war Europe. (Note: Petranović, like Kamber, was wanted by the Yugoslav authorities on war crimes charges.) In late 1945, Kamber was granted an audience with Cardinal Eugène Tisserant. When Tisserant asked him how the Ustaše brought themselves to massacre 300,000 Serbs, he was "taken aback by the directness of the question and could not immediately answer." He later wrote the Cardinal a letter in which he asserted that the Serbs had killed 50,000−60,000 Croats from 1918 to 1941. The historian Jozo Tomasevich characterizes Kamber's claims as "by far the most absurd figures on the number of Croats supposedly killed by the Serbs in interwar Yugoslavia". In April 1947, the Yugoslav government issued a warrant for Kamber's arrest. After considering the possibility that the accusations against him were communist propaganda, the British consul in Zagreb concluded after an investigation that Kamber was "responsible, to some extent, for the massacres at Doboj" and had "incited [the] wholesale massacre of Serbs" in that town.

Kamber subsequently continued to Francoist Spain and Argentina. From 1947 to 1950, he worked as a chaplain and teacher in Buenos Aires, after which he immigrated to the United States. From 1950 to 1954, he served as a parish priest in Gary, Indiana and a visiting priest in Detroit. Afterwards, he served as a parish priest in Lynch, Nebraska. He eventually became a naturalized American citizen. Kamber was as prolific a writer after the war as he had been before it, contributing to dozens of Croatian diaspora publications, most notably Hrvatska revija and the Journal of Croatian Studies. He used the pen names Combattant, Simon Stilita (Simeon Stylites), Romanus ("Roman"), Parižlija ("Parisian") and Englez ("Englishman"). In the latter half of the 1940s, he had written under the pseudonym Martin Tadić. Under the name Charles Kamber, which he used after settling in the United States, he contributed to the 1955 book The Croatian Nation in its Struggle for Freedom and Independence, which also contained entries written by other former Ustaše officials, such as Ivo Omrčanin and Vilko Rieger (writing under the pen name George W. Cesarich). (Note: For Rieger's use of the pseudonym, see: Tomasevich (2001, pp. 344–345).) In his booklet Relations between Croats of Catholic and Muslim Faiths, Kamber wrote: "If we do not want to lose or partition Bosnia, we have to preserve in it a compact and overall Croatian majority. We can only have this majority when all Muslims become consciously Croats, and not only with a Muslim majority, even if that majority were very large. Only when all Catholics and all Muslims become united can we Croats obtain a majority of about 55 percent." Elsewhere, Kamber criticized former Croatian politician Vladko Maček's post-war memoirs for failing to expound on what he regarded as the persecution of the Catholic Church in interwar Yugoslavia. In response, Maček stated, "I could not write about the persecution of the Catholic Church because to the best of my knowledge, such persecution did not exist." Tomasevich concurs with Maček's assessment, noting that while the Church may have been subjected to discriminatory policies in the interwar years, it was never persecuted outright.

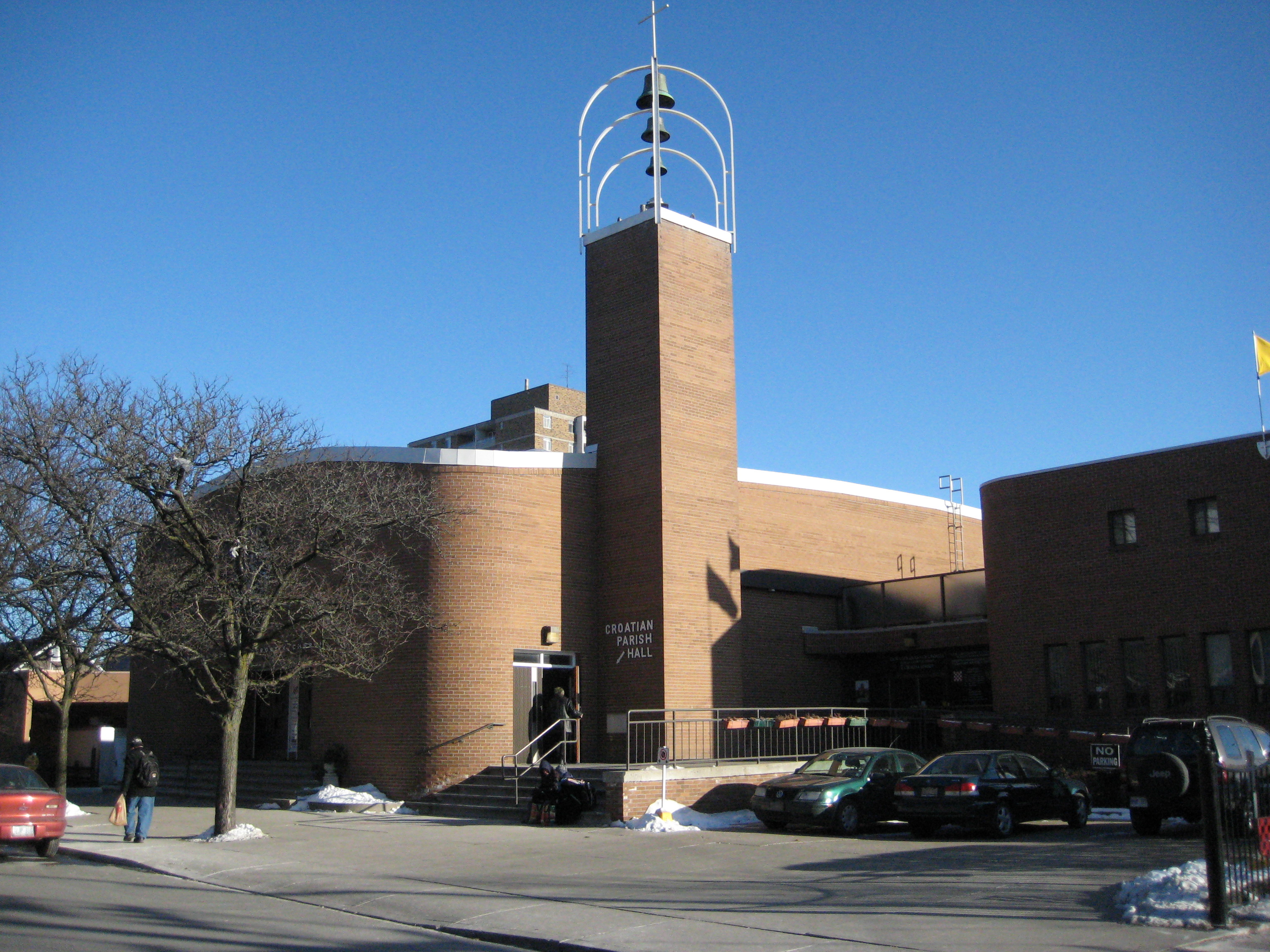
Our Lady Queen of Croatia Church in Toronto, 2010

In 1958, Kamber appeared as a defense witness at the deportation hearings of Andrija Artuković, the NDH's erstwhile Minister of Internal Affairs who in the post-war years had settled in Los Angeles with his family. He testified that "no one person could be held accountable" for the atrocities Artuković was accused of committing. The court ultimately ruled in Artuković's favour. (Note: After an extradition saga lasting several decades, Artuković was extradited to Yugoslavia to face war crimes charges in 1986. He was ultimately found guilty and sentenced to death, but died in 1988 while awaiting execution.) In 1961, Kamber became the parish priest at Our Lady Queen of Croatia Church in Toronto. His parish consisted of former Ustaše fighters, refugees fleeing the collapse of the NDH, as well as a younger generation who spent their formative years in socialist Yugoslavia. The latter demographic, despite their fierce anti-communism, was not as religiously observant as the older generations and was more receptive to the trappings of North American materialism. According to the historian Roberto Perin, these members of the community "did not hesitate to beat up parishioners, even in the church vestibule, who were judged to be insufficiently patriotic." In 1962, Our Lady Queen of Croatia was destroyed in a fire. Publicly, Kamber blamed communists for the blaze, claiming that his wartime record, as well as the fact that some of his parishioners had protested in front of the Yugoslav consulate in Toronto, had made it a target. Privately, he attributed the fire to "emotionally and psychologically troubled elements in his parish."

Kamber assumed a leading role in the effort to rebuild the church, which would last for the next three years. In August 1962, he was a delegate to the All-Croatian Congress in New York. This convention was hosted by the United American Croats (Croatian: Ujedinjeni Američki Hrvati; UAH). In the post-war dispute between Pavelić and former Ustaše official Vjekoslav Luburić for sway over Ustaše émigré communities, the UAH took the side of Luburić and his Croatian National Resistance. On 20 October 1966, Kamber co-authored the statement of the Association of Croatian Priests in the United States and Canada on the protocol between the Vatican and Yugoslavia. He died in Toronto on 20 June 1969.

== Legacy ==
McCormick ranks Kamber among those Catholic priests who "ventured far beyond merely converting Orthodox Serbs and became gleeful murderers." Kamber remained unapologetic about his wartime record up to his death, and was critical of Catholic Church for not offering more support to the NDH during its formative months. Yet, in a posthumously published article, he expressed disapproval of the NDH's wartime leadership:

Many people, when they look back today on our wartime Independent State of Croatia, see only the aspect of evil that it brought on our present and future. Without any doubt there was evil, unfortunately even too much of it. A considerable number of those who directed our human and national destinies during the war showed, unfortunately, that they were not qualified to administer even a more advanced establishment for livestock husbandry, let alone steer in a responsible, politically wise, and statesmanlike manner the ship of state through the tempests of war and Balkan and world upheaval.

After Kamber's death, the Franciscans tried to take control of his parish, but the Episcopal Conference of Yugoslavia managed to win out and replaced him with their own preferred candidate, Father Josip Gjuran. Although not as ideologically committed as his predecessor, Gjuran avoided criticizing the Ustaše in order to remain on good terms with his parishioners, as he would admit in a subsequent interview: "Our people were sympathetic to Pavelić's state and I was serving those people as church leader, I wasn't a political activist. I would have been stupid to fight against my own people."

Kamber is the namesake of Father Kamber Park on the grounds of the Church of the Croatian Martyrs in Mississauga, Ontario. The park has been the site of annual celebrations marking the anniversary of the NDH's establishment on 10 April 1941. Kamber's correspondences with Cardinal Eugène Tisserant and the sculptor Ivan Meštrović, among others, were published posthumously. His letters to Ustaše ideologue Vinko Nikolić are kept in the National and University Library in Zagreb, and his correspondence with the ratline organizer Krunoslav Draganović is archived at the Pontifical Croatian College of St. Jerome. As of 2009, a part of Kamber's manuscripts were in the possession of the historian Jere Jareb.

== See also ==
- Ivo Omrčanin
- Nikola Rušinović
