= Ovrlja =

Settlement in Split-Dalmatia County, Croatia

- Settlement
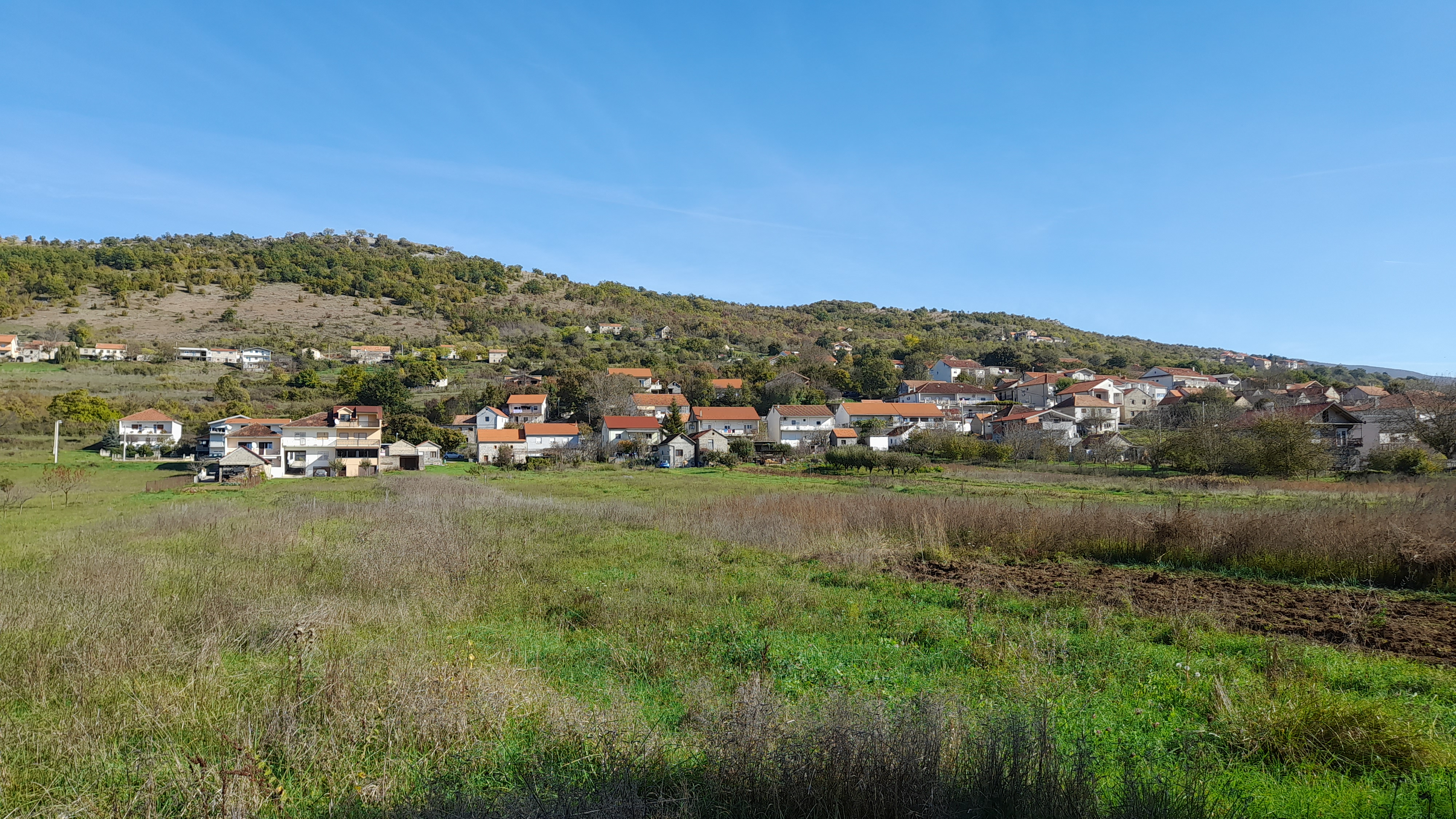
- Interactive map of Ovrlja
- Location within Croatia
- Coordinates: 43°40′49″N 16°45′03″E
- Country: Croatia
- County: Split-Dalmatia
- Municipality: Otok

Area
  - Total: 7.0 km^{2} (2.7 sq mi)

Population (2021)
  - Total: 173
  - Density: 25/km^{2} (64/sq mi)
- Time zone: UTC+1 (CET)
  - Summer (DST): UTC+2 (CEST)
- Postal code: 21238 Otok
- Area code: +385 (0)21

Ovrlja is a settlement in the Municipality of Otok in Croatia. In 2021, its population was 173.

== Demographics ==
Ovrlja: Population trends 1857–2021
v

population	151			246	259	136		205	221	215	226	199	238	222	214	190	173
	1857	1869	1880	1890	1900	1910	1921	1931	1948	1953	1961	1971	1981	1991	2001	2011	2021

Note:In 1869, 1880 and 1921, the population data were contained in the population data for the settlement of Otok. Sources: Croatian Bureau of Statistics publications
