= Korita, Split-Dalmatia County =

Settlement in Split-Dalmatia County, Croatia

Korita
- Settlement
- Interactive map of Korita
- Location within Croatia
- Coordinates: 43°42′05″N 16°48′18″E
- Country: Croatia
- County: Split-Dalmatia
- Municipality: Otok

Area
  - Total: 23.2 km^{2} (9.0 sq mi)

Population (2021)
  - Total: 2
  - Density: 0.086/km^{2} (0.22/sq mi)
- Time zone: UTC+1 (CET)
  - Summer (DST): UTC+2 (CEST)
- Postal code: 21238 Otok
- Area code: +385 (0)21

Korita is a settlement in the Municipality of Otok in Croatia. In 2021, its population was 2.

== Demographics ==
Korita: Population trends 1857–2021
v

population	119		259	146	187	217			247	240	244	223	18	4	4	3	2
	1857	1869	1880	1890	1900	1910	1921	1931	1948	1953	1961	1971	1981	1991	2001	2011	2021

Sources: Croatian Bureau of Statistics publications
