= Ruda, Croatia =

Settlement in Split-Dalmatia County, Croatia

Ruda
- Settlement
- Interactive map of Ruda
- Location within Croatia
- Coordinates: 43°40′19″N 16°47′06″E
- Country: Croatia
- County: Split-Dalmatia
- Municipality: Otok

Area
  - Total: 29.9 km^{2} (11.5 sq mi)

Population (2021)
  - Total: 812
  - Density: 27.2/km^{2} (70.3/sq mi)
- Time zone: UTC+1 (CET)
  - Summer (DST): UTC+2 (CEST)
- Postal code: 21238 Otok
- Area code: +385 (0)21

Ruda is a settlement in the Municipality of Otok in Croatia. In 2021, its population was 812.

== Demographics ==
Ruda: Population trends 1857–2021
v

population	608	753	796	920	1097	1201	1203	1161	1056	1177	1261	1317	1340	1368	994	880	812
	1857	1869	1880	1890	1900	1910	1921	1931	1948	1953	1961	1971	1981	1991	2001	2011	2021

Sources: Croatian Bureau of Statistics publications

== Notable people ==
- Dragutin Kamber
