= Edoardo Prettner Cippico =

Italian Catholic priest and official in the Vatican Secret Archive

Edoardo Prettner Cippico (10 October 1905–7 April 1983) was an Italian Catholic priest and official in the Vatican Secret Archive who was imprisoned in 1948 on charges of financial crimes, and later revealed to have spied for the Soviet Union. The Cippico scandal embarrassed the Vatican and the Catholic Church in the buildup to the 1948 general election in which the leftist Popular Democratic Front presented a strong challenge to the Catholic-aligned Christian Democracy government.

== Early life ==
Cippico was born Eduard Prettner in the Imperial Free City of Trieste, then part of the Austrian Littoral. He was raised bilingually by his Cippico mother, a Dalmatian Italian from Traù (now Trogir), and his German-speaking Prettner father. His choice of career was motivated by material gain rather than a priestly vocation. His father's brother was a senator and a friend of the bishops of Trento and of Trieste, who secured his place at the Pontifical Gregorian University. Cippico was a polyglot and translated theological works from French into Italian. In late 1932 he joined the Roman Curia as an archivist, first in the Pontifical Commission for Russia; some documents known to have been passed to the Soviets at this time were sent by either Cippico or his predecessor Alexander Deubner. In 1937 he was made a supernumerary Papal Chamberlain. Later, he was archivist in the Dicastery for the Eastern Churches and, from 1940, the Secretariat of State, whereupon he was made a Prelate of Honour of His Holiness, entitled to the style "monsignor".

== Wartime career ==
Cippico's knowledge of Croatian caused Luigi Maglione to choose him to attend, with noncommittal cordiality, to Nikola Rušinović, envoy from the Independent State of Croatia. Cippico and lawyer Antonio Milo di Villagrazia helped Pascalina Lehnert to prepare a 1943 contingency plan to spirit Pope Pius XII to Francoist Spain in the event that the German invasion of Italy threatened the Vatican City. In 1944, Cippico frustrated Edvard Kocbek's mission to secure an audience with the pope on behalf of the Anti-Fascist Council for the National Liberation of Yugoslavia. Cippico responded to later accusations of having spied for the Soviets not with denial but with reference to his wartime co-operation with the U.S. Office of Strategic Services. He aided Italian Jews before and during the Holocaust in Italy: Luciano Morpurgo said he and other Jews sheltered in Cippico's apartment by the Leonine Wall, and he stowed valuables for Jews fearing their confiscation. Giorgio Volterra, who fled to Argentina in 1939, claimed Cippico had taken all his money to arrange passage. Cippico had an affluent lifestyle, liked the company of women, and by 1947 owned a large apartment and three cars.

== 1948 scandal ==
External image
- Cippico entering court handcuffed in 1949

According to Sergio Amidei, Cippico secretly funded Paulo William Tamburella's production of the 1946 film Shoeshine; he also planned a biopic of Francis of Assisi. In August 1947 an industrialist complained to the pope about the high interest charged on a loan from the Administration of the Property of the Holy See (ABSS). An inquiry found that Cippico had forged the signatures of Secretariat of State officials and pocketed the excessive interest on the loan. He was suspended from his office on 2 September 1947 and investigated further. Documents from the Secretariat were missing, although they later turned up. It was alleged that Cippico used his contacts in foreign Catholic institutions to enable rich Italians to bypass foreign exchange controls and send money abroad via the Institute for the Works of Religion (the IOR or "Vatican Bank"), and also that he siphoned off for himself some of the money from these transactions. It was also alleged that he sold goods belonging to the church, and stole US$100,000 worth of jewellery entrusted by Enrico Paolo Salem (son of Anna D'Angeri) the podestà of Trieste until its German occupation. In early 1948 he was removed from office, arrested, and held in the Tower of the Winds. On 28 January 1948, Giulio Guidetti resigned as secretary of the ABSS due to a similar fraud linked by some media to Cippico's; he died soon after. On 3 March, Cippico escaped from his loose confinement and fled the Vatican into Italian Rome. He was suspended (or laicized; sources differ) by the Holy See after his escape, to enable the Italian civil authorities to charge him.

The events were secret until a brief mention in the Vatican newspaper L'Osservatore Romano the morning before Cippico's escape, intended to pre-empt the story being broken by hostile leftwing media, which soon dubbed Cippico "Monsignor Cagliostro" and suggested he was a scapegoat to hide deeper corruption. L'Unità devoted its whole front page of 6 March to the affair. Rightwingers responded by treating Cippico as a bad apple, accusing him of spying for communist Yugoslavia, and reviving allegations that Communists had stolen Mussolini's cache of gold (the Oro di Dongo) after his death in 1945. By the time of the April election it was clear that "the wilder [conspiracy] theories were unfounded" and most voters viewed the story with amusement rather than anger. Primo Mazzolari's diary, published in 2016, gives a dispassionate contemporary account of the case.

On 7 March, Cippico was charged with fraud and forgery amounting to about 1 billion lira (US$1.7 million). He was arrested on 9 March 1948 in the Parioli house of a former Fascist general, and remanded in Regina Coeli prison until March 1950. Finally tried in November 1952, he was found guilty on 11 counts in December and sentenced to nine years' imprisonment and a fine of 250,000 liras. He was acquitted on 4 counts, including the jewellery theft, and his four co-accused were acquitted on all counts, except for one fined 20,000 liras. His actual sentence amounted to four years, with two years already on remand and three years remitted. This was reduced to five years. In 1953 the Italian Communist press responded to reports that Catholic clergy imprisoned in Eastern Europe were religious victims of trumped-up charges by calling them "Cippicos" justly punished for ordinary crimes. In 1954 Cippico lodged an appeal, and in 1956 the Court of Cassation overturned his conviction as unsafe given the postwar confusion during which the alleged crimes took place. Cippico published pamphlets giving his version of the affair in 1950 and 1954. He claimed to have been an unknowing go-between in the IOR transactions and that he had left the Tower of the Winds to celebrate his mother's name day.

== Later life ==
After the Cassation decision, Cippico petitioned the pope to have his laicization reversed. In 1959, Pope John XXIII granted the request and restored Cippico as monsignor, while preventing him from administering sacraments apart from saying Mass in private (sine populo). A La Stampa article listed his various rumoured crimes, and his own response. In 1961 he was affiliated with Pro Civitate Christiana. In his 1962 book La Chiesa verso il 2000, Cippico supported what became the Second Vatican Council reforms and rapprochement with Warsaw Pact countries. Around 1965 he was rumoured to have co-written works under a pen name. He had an unpublicised leadership role in the Catholic Centre for Public Relations set up in 1964 by Alain Peyrefitte and the U.S. bishops' conference. From 1973 Milo di Villagrazia funded a "research and information service" for Cippico in the Palazzo Massimo alle Colonne. In the 1960s and 1970s he secretly passed to Warsaw Pact embassies information and copies of internal Holy See documents given by former colleagues, including reports by Corrado Bafile as Apostolic Nuncio in Bonn.

From the 1970s Cippico had a relationship with Gertrude "Traudl" Lechner (née Parth), a divorced former prostitute from Laas, South Tyrol whose official role was as his housekeeper. Cippico died at his home near Porta Angelica in Rome, of complications from diabetes. He was buried in Trieste. Lechner gave historian Hansjakob Stehle access to Cippico's archive, and in 2003 he published some of Bafile's reports (crediting "Waltraud" Lechner).

== Sources ==
- Alvarez, David J. (2002). Spies in the Vatican: Espionage & Intrigue from Napoleon to the Holocaust. University Press of Kansas. doi:10.2307/j.ctt1bmzk5v. ISBN 978-0-7006-1214-7. JSTOR j.ctt1bmzk5v. Project MUSE book 46026.
- Stehle, Hansjakob (2003). "Geheimes aus Bonn für Moskau vom Vatikan. Der vielseitige Agent Monsignore Edoardo Prettner Cippico und sein Nachlaß" (PDF). Vierteljahrshefte für Zeitgeschichte (in German). 51 (2): 263–283. JSTOR 30196698.
