= Otok, Split-Dalmatia County =

Municipality in Split-Dalmatia County, Croatia

Otok
- Municipality
- Interactive map of Otok
- Location of Otok in Croatia
- Coordinates: 43°41′N 16°47′E
- Country: Croatia
- Region: Dalmatian Hinterland
- County: Split-Dalmatia County

Area
  - Municipality: 94.7 km^{2} (36.6 sq mi)
  - Urban: 12.9 km^{2} (5.0 sq mi)

Population (2021)
  - Municipality: 4,998
  - Density: 52.8/km^{2} (137/sq mi)
  - Urban: 2,807
  - Urban density: 218/km^{2} (564/sq mi)
- Website: opcina-otok.hr

Otok is a municipality and a village in inland Dalmatia, Croatia, located east of Sinj, approximately 7 kilometers away. Otok is bordered by the river Cetina and mountain Kamešnica.

== Demographics ==
The total population of Otok municipality is 5,474, in the following settlements:

- Gala, population 896
- Korita, population 3
- Otok, population 3,090
- Ovrlja, 190
- Ruda, population 880
- Udovičić, population 415
Otok: Population trends 1857–2021
v

population	2107	2513	2693	3153	3710	4181	4363	4703	4818	5272	5426	5988	6256	6574	5782	5474	4998
	1857	1869	1880	1890	1900	1910	1921	1931	1948	1953	1961	1971	1981	1991	2001	2011	2021

Sources: Croatian Bureau of Statistics publications
