= Ivo Omrčanin =

Croatian-American professor and fascist collaborator

- Omrčanin as seen in the 1988 documentary Hotel Terminus
- Born: 1 October 1913; Podgrađe, Kingdom of Croatia-Slavonia, Austria-Hungary
- Died: 20 February 2001 (aged 87); Washington, D.C., United States
- Spouse: Margaret Stewart-Omrčanin (m. 1966)

Academic background
- Education: Pontifical Gregorian University; Catholic University of Paris; University of Trieste

Academic work
- Institutions: Assumption College (1957–1960); Indiana University of Pennsylvania (1962–1979)

Ivo Omrčanin (1 October 1913 – 20 February 2001) was a Croatian theologian, diplomat and Catholic layman who served as the chargé d'affaires of the Independent State of Croatia's embassy to Nazi Germany in Berlin during the final months of World War II. He later played a leading role in the post-war ratlines which smuggled former Axis officials out of Europe.

Following the Allied victory, he escaped to Rome, where he became involved with the Catholic priest Krunoslav Draganović, a prominent ratline organizer. In Omrčanin's own estimation, 30,000 Axis officials left Europe using the ratlines. Among those whom he personally helped escape were Croatian dictator Ante Pavelić and German commander Klaus Barbie. From 1953 to 1957, Omrčanin worked as an advisor in canon law to the U.S. Army chaplains office in Kaiserslautern, West Germany. Afterwards, he immigrated to the United States and worked as a professor at Assumption College and the Indiana University of Pennsylvania, as well as a translator for the U.S. State Department. In subsequent decades, he wrote numerous pro-Ustaše tracts denying the Holocaust and the genocide of Serbs in the NDH, and claiming that half a million or more Ustaše prisoners and Croatian civilians had been executed by the Yugoslav Partisans in the Bleiburg killings of 1945.

Omrčanin was featured as an interview subject in Marcel Ophuls's 1988 film Hotel Terminus: The Life and Times of Klaus Barbie, and controversially, was cited by political scientist R. J. Rummel in his 1999 book Statistics of Democide regarding the number of victims of communism in Yugoslavia. He died in Washington, D.C. in 2001.

== Early life ==
Ivo Omrčanin was born in the eastern Slavonian village of Podgrađe, in what was then Austria-Hungary, on 1 October 1913. He received a doctorate in theology from the Pontifical Gregorian University in Rome in 1939 and a doctorate in canon law from the Catholic University of Paris in 1940.

== World War II ==
When the Axis invasion of Yugoslavia commenced on 6 April 1941, Omrčanin was in the town of Banja Luka, in northwestern Bosnia. He came to Zagreb on 18 April, and soon joined the Ministry of Foreign Affairs of the Axis puppet state known as the Independent State of Croatia (Croatian: Nezavisna država Hrvatska; NDH). Over the next several years, he fulfilled several functions in the Ministry of Foreign Affairs, including as the head of its Italian section and its chief of protocol. In 1942, he helped repatriate the baptismal font of the ninth-century Croatian duke Višeslav from Italy, and had it transported to Zagreb and handed over to the Croatian Academy. In 1944, he received a bachelor of laws from the University of Trieste.

On 1 September 1944, Omrčanin was appointed as the NDH's minister plenipotentiary and chargé d'affaires to Nazi Germany in Berlin. This was because he spoke fluent German. On 1 March 1945, he participated in negotiations with Allied representatives regarding the surrender of Ustaše and Croatian Home Guard units. Following the collapse of the NDH in May, he fled before Josip Broz Tito's victorious Partisans and settled in Rome.

== Post-war ratlines ==
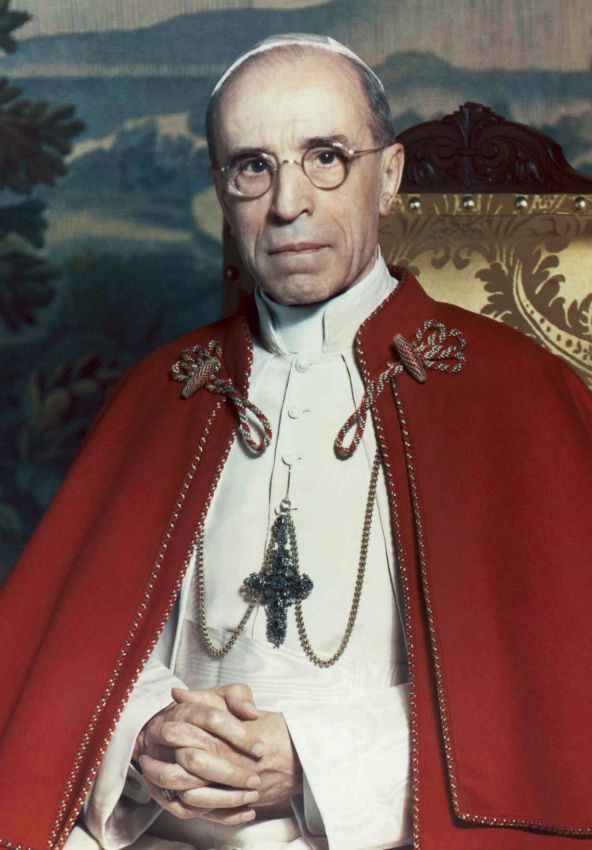
In June 1946, Omrčanin and former Ustaše official Vinko Nikolić were granted an audience with Pope Pius XII. Nikolić later welcomed the NDH's former dictator Ante Pavelić on his arrival in Argentina.

According to Omrčanin, in June 1945, the British immediately accepted the Ustaše offer, conveyed to them through Archbishop Andreas Rohracher, to "put themselves at the disposal of Anglo–American leadership". Additionally, Omrčanin told Italian officials at the time that former Croatian dictator Ante Pavelić and members of his inner circle were "holding regular meetings with sympathetic elements of the British forces, who have been paying for the reorganisation of a united Ustashi for eventual use against Tito."

In the immediate post-war years, Omrčanin lived in Rome's San Paolo alla Regola and worked as a lawyer at the Roman Rota, the highest appellate tribunal of the Catholic Church. As the right-hand man of the Catholic priest Krunoslav Draganović, he became a central figure in the post-war ratlines which smuggled thousands of former Axis officials out of Europe. From 1948 to 1953, he worked directly under Draganović as part of the Croatian Committee of Pontifical Assistance. Draganović used church resources to arrange safe passage for "many thousands of our people," as Omrčanin put it. "He helped as much of the government as he could, not excepting the security officials." Omrčanin also worked closely with Austrian bishop Alois Hudal. "Whenever I saw Draganović or Hudal, it was mostly to discuss things," he recounted. "I was helping them, or they were giving me advice. I fought for Europe, and didn't want Europe to have to suffer so much." According to Omrčanin, Draganović had "good contacts with the Americans," who were interested in collecting intelligence from refugees fleeing the Eastern Bloc. Citing the work of investigative reporter Holger Meding, journalist Ignacio Montes de Oca believes it is likely that Omrčanin and Draganović's activities were done in coordination with American counterintelligence.

In June 1946, Omrčanin and another former Ustaše official, Vinko Nikolić, were granted an audience with Pope Pius XII. In November 1948, Nikolić was among those who greeted Pavelić upon his arrival at the port of Buenos Aires. Omrčanin later said, "the Pope would never have considered anyone who was fighting communism ... a war criminal." In 1948, Omrčanin convinced the Holy See to establish a Croatian-language edition of Vatican Radio. In a report dated 21 November 1948, Italian counterintelligence noted the transit along the Brenner Railway of "a party of fifty-two foreigners of various nationalities coming from Salzburg and headed for Rome." Among the travelers was Slavko Cesarić, a former general in the Croatian Armed Forces. The report continued that the party had been greeted by Omrčanin, who "at no charge" had provided them with "food and a train ticket from the Brenner to Rome." On other occasions, Omrčanin was known to be less affable—British officials once reported seeing him beat a suspected informant with an umbrella. (Note: The man in question was Božidar Vučković, who was suspected of having helped the British plan the arrest of Croatian exiles living around the Institute of St. Jerome.)

Omrčanin boasted that 30,000 people were smuggled out using the ratlines, including many German scientists and technicians. He estimated that the number of German scientists he evacuated to South America numbered in the "thousands". The Italian government alerted the Western powers of his activities, but nothing was ever done. Among those whom Omrčanin personally helped escape were Pavelić and German commander Klaus Barbie.

== Professorship and published works ==
From 1953 to 1957, Omrčanin was an advisor in canon law to the U.S. Army chaplains office in Kaiserslautern, West Germany. Around this time, he became an early member of the Croatian National Resistance (Croatian: Hrvatski narodni otpor; HNO), which was founded in Munich in 1955. Despite what historian Robert B. McCormick describes as his "dodgy background", he managed to immigrate to the United States in the 1950s. In 1957, he was appointed as an assistant professor at Assumption College in Worcester, Massachusetts. The following year, he testified as an expert witness for the defense at the extradition hearing of former NDH interior minister Andrija Artuković in Los Angeles, denying he had ever heard Artuković make anti-Semitic remarks and describing him as "a friend to all men". (Note: After an extradition saga lasting several decades, Artuković was extradited to Yugoslavia to face war crimes charges in 1986. He was ultimately found guilty and sentenced to death, but died in 1988 while awaiting execution.) From 1960 to 1962, Omrčanin worked as a translator for the State Department in Washington, D.C., and in 1962, he was appointed as an associate professor of modern languages at the Indiana University of Pennsylvania in Indiana, Pennsylvania. In 1966, he married English-language professor Margaret Stewart. Over the years, she co-authored and helped edit some of his works.

Of all the post-war Croatian émigré writers, the historian Christopher A. Molnar ranks Omrčanin among the most prolific. For decades, he engaged in the production of what authors Mark Aarons and John Loftus describe as a "stream of pro-Ustashi propaganda tracts". In his 1957 book Istina o Draži Mihailoviću ("The Truth about Draža Mihailović")—about the wartime leader of the Serbian nationalist Chetniks, Draža Mihailović—he coined the term "Croatophobia" to describe anti-Croat sentiment. In a 1959 German-language booklet titled Kroatische Priester emordet von Tschetniken und Kommunisten ("Croatian Priests Murdered by Chetniks and Communists"), he claimed that "Serbs and Communists" had killed one million Croats since 1918 and called for the re-establishment of an independent Croatian state. In the 1975 book The Pro-Allied Putsch in Croatia, he argued that one could not equate support for the NDH with support for Nazism, citing the ill-fated Lorković–Vokić plot of 1944 as evidence that an anti-fascist current ran through the puppet state's government. The political scientist David Bruce MacDonald argues that Omrčanin "was clearly trying to vindicate the Ustaša position" and that such a thesis would have been "a useful means of legitimating his role in the government." In his 1984 book Enigma Tito, Omrčanin asserted that the Yugoslav leader was "a certified British agent of long standing", although according to scholar Ivo Tasovac, he "offered no tangible evidence to support it". In Holocaust of Croatians (1986), Omrčanin claimed that Croats were the "greatest victims" of World War II and wrote, "In the past, Jews embraced Communism to destroy as much of western civilization and western nations as possible." The anthropologist Daphne Winland writes that the latter statement "betrays the author's fascist and antisemitic inclinations."

The scholar Vjekoslav Perica characterizes Omrčanin, together with Vinko Nikolić, as one of the "architects" of the so-called Bleiburg myth, which contends that during the post-war Bleiburg killings, hundreds of thousands of Croatian Armed Forces prisoners and their families were tortured and massacred by the Partisans. In some of his writings, Omrčanin asserted that "500,000 Catholic and Muslim Croats" had been killed at Bleiburg. Elsewhere, he suggested "the Bolsheviks killed 550,000 Croats (300,000 from the army and 200,000 civilians)," and fumed that this figure had been brought down by other researchers "to 26,000 Ustashe and 18,000 Domobrani [Home Guards]." He cited the Austrian military historian Rudolf Kiszling as the source for his estimates. Kiszling, in turn, had cited Omrčanin's colleague Krunoslav Draganović, who said he believed "that after the Bleiburg capitulation there were at least fifty Katyns" in Yugoslavia. Although mass executions of Ustaše prisoners did take place, there were many orders of magnitude fewer victims than Omrčanin and Nikolić suggested. Omrčanin's inflated estimates were criticized by the Croatian demographer Vladimir Žerjavić, who was equally critical of Serbian scholar Milan Bulajić's inflation of the number of Serb war victims. Žerjavić estimated that around 50,000 collaborationist prisoners were killed at Bleiburg, including Ustaše, Chetniks and others. In response, Omrčanin told the Croatian tabloid Slobodni tjednik: "Žerjavic's work is a falsification. It is [Holocaust survivor and researcher] Slavko Goldstein who has paid [for] it. He is rich and receives enormous amounts of money from American Jews." He further claimed that "not one Jew was killed in Croatia until the autumn of 1944" and "it was nowhere as good for the Jews as in Croatia".

== Later years ==
Omrčanin was a member of the Canon Law Society of America, the Modern Language Association of America, the Croatian Academy of America, the Croatian Historical Institute and the Catholic Renaissance Society. Following his retirement in 1979, he and his wife moved into the Watergate complex in Washington, and he became active in the Institute for Historical Review, an American non-profit founded in 1978 which promotes Holocaust denial. In a 1986 interview, he confirmed that the Vatican's undersecretary of state Giovanni Montini, who later became Pope Paul VI, was fully aware of Draganović's efforts. Omrčanin was featured in Marcel Ophuls's 1988 film Hotel Terminus: The Life and Times of Klaus Barbie, which went on to win that year's Academy Award for Best Documentary Feature Film.

Between 1989 and 1991, Omrčanin published a five-volume history of the NDH titled Hrvatska 1941–1945. ("Croatia, 1941–1945"). Following Croatia's declaration of independence from Yugoslavia in June 1991, he visited the country after many decades. He told Slobodni tjednik he intended to establish a new political party, accused Jews of massacring Croats in the war, and claimed that Jasenovac―the largest of the NDH's concentration camps―was "a Hollywood production", adding, "You can see how big of an imagination these Jews have when they make cartoons. Those are all made by Jews."

Controversially, Omrčanin was one of several pro-fascist sources cited by political scientist R. J. Rummel in his 1999 book Statistics of Democide regarding the number of victims of communism in Yugoslavia. This became the subject of extensive critique in historian Tomislav Dulić's 2004 essay Tito's Slaughterhouse: A Critical Analysis of Rummel's Work on Democide. Omrčanin died on 20 February 2001, at the age of 87.

== See also ==
- Alija Šuljak
- Dragutin Kamber
- Ivo Rojnica
- Nikola Rušinović
