= Udovičić, Croatia =

Settlement in Split-Dalmatia County, Croatia

Udovičić Udovičići
- Settlement
- Interactive map of Udovičić
- Location within Croatia
- Coordinates: 43°39′54″N 16°45′00″E
- Country: Croatia
- County: Split-Dalmatia
- Municipality: Otok

Area
  - Total: 7.3 km^{2} (2.8 sq mi)

Population (2021)
  - Total: 398
  - Density: 55/km^{2} (140/sq mi)
- Time zone: UTC+1 (CET)
  - Summer (DST): UTC+2 (CEST)
- Postal code: 21238 Otok
- Area code: +385 (0)21

Udovičić or Udovičići is a settlement in the Municipality of Otok in Croatia. In 2021, its population was 398.

== Demographics ==
Udovičić: Population trends 1857–2021
v

population	190	551	339	277	332	478	594	411	488	546	562	570	513	462	416	415	398
	1857	1869	1880	1890	1900	1910	1921	1931	1948	1953	1961	1971	1981	1991	2001	2011	2021

Sources: Croatian Bureau of Statistics publications
