= Hotel Terminus: The Life and Times of Klaus Barbie =

1988 American documentary film

- Film poster
- Directed by: Marcel Ophuls
- Produced by: Marcel Ophuls
- Cinematography: Michael Davis; Pierre Boffety; Reuben Aaronson; Wilhelm Rosing; Lionel Legros; Daniel Chabert; Paul Gonon; Hans Haber
- Edited by: Albert Jurgenson; Catherine Zins
- Music by: Maurice Jarre
- Production company: Memory Pictures
- Distributed by: The Samuel Goldwyn Company
- Release dates: 10 May 1988 (Cannes); 6 October 1988 (NYFF)
- Running time: 267 minutes
- Country: United States
- Languages: French; German; Spanish; English
- Box office: $341,018

Hotel Terminus: The Life and Times of Klaus Barbie (French: Hôtel Terminus: Klaus Barbie, sa vie et son temps) is a 1988 American documentary film by Marcel Ophuls about the life of Nazi war criminal Klaus Barbie. The film covers Barbie's relatively innocent childhood, his time with the Gestapo in Lyon (where he apparently excelled at torture), through to the forty years between the end of World War II and his eventual deportation from Bolivia to stand trial for crimes against humanity in France. The film explores a number of themes, including the nature of evil and the diffusion of responsibility in hierarchical situations.

The film won the 1988 Academy Award for Best Documentary Feature, as well as the FIPRESCI Award at the 1988 Cannes Film Festival.

== Synopsis ==
The film features interviews with both supporters and opponents of Barbie's trial, ranging from journalists to former U.S. Counter Intelligence Corps agents, independent investigators of Nazi war crimes, and Barbie's defense attorney. Much of the testimony presented is contradictory. For example, some interviewees allege that Barbie was brought to trial merely as a figurehead, while others claim that he remained free for forty years due to the protection of various governments, including the United States and Bolivia. This protection allegedly stemmed from Barbie's connections with secret agents, and a public trial could potentially jeopardize intelligence operations.

Among those interviewed by Ophuls were Barbie's lawyer, Jacques Vergès; writer Günter Grass; American intelligence officer Eugene Kolb, who insisted that Barbie was "too professional" to have tortured people; philosopher Régis Debray, who was captured by the Bolivian Army in 1967; Daniel Cordier, who served as the secretary to Jean Moulin; Nazi hunters Serge Klarsfeld and his wife Beate Klarsfeld; philosopher Alain Finkielkraut; Gestapo officer Harry Stengritt; poet René Tavernier; Jean-Marie Le Pen of the Front national; Croatian theologian and ratline organizer Ivo Omrčanin, who helped smuggle Barbie into Bolivia; Frenchwoman Simone Lagrange, deported by Barbie from Lyon to Auschwitz; former Bolivian president General Guido Vildoso, who employed Barbie as his "security consultant"; student radical Daniel Cohn-Bendit; filmmaker Claude Lanzmann (Shoah); résistant Raymond Aubrac and his wife Lucie Aubrac; résistant René Hardy; and Hardy's former mistress Lydie Bastien, who claimed to possess magical powers to bring bad luck to those who displeased her.

Within the course of the film, Barbie is brought to trial and sentenced to life in prison. Near the end, his defense attorney vows to appeal the decision.

== Release ==
Hotel Terminus: The Life and Times of Klaus Barbie had its world premiere at the Cannes Film Festival on 10 May 1988. It was later shown at the New York Film Festival on 6 October 1988, followed by screenings in New York on October 9, 1988 and October 26, 1988.

== Reception ==
On the review aggregator website Rotten Tomatoes, 100% of six critics' reviews are positive.

Roger Ebert of the Chicago Sun-Times gave the film three out of four stars and wrote, "It is a stubborn, angry, nagging, sarcastic assault on good manners, and I am happy Ophuls was ill-tempered enough to make it."
