= Freed from Desire =

1996 single by Gala

Single by Gala

from the album Come into My Life
- Released: 1996
- Genre: Eurodance
- Length: 3:50 (album version); 3:27 (single)
- Label: Nitelite
- Songwriters: Maurizio Molella; Filippo Andrea Carmeni; Gala Rizzatto
- Producers: DJ Molella; Phil Jay

Gala singles chronology
"Everyone Has Inside" (1996)	"Freed from Desire" (1996)	"Let a Boy Cry" (1997)

Audio sample
- file; help

Alternative cover

Music video
- "Freed from Desire" on YouTube

"Freed from Desire" is a Eurodance song by Italian singer and songwriter Gala. Produced by DJ Molella and Phil Jay, it was released in 1996 as the first single from her debut album, Come into My Life (1997). It was a hit in many European countries, reaching number one in France and Belgium (Flanders and Wallonia). The track was released in the UK in July 1997, peaking at number two and spending eight weeks inside the top 10 and 14 weeks in total in the top 75. Gala achieved a diamond recording certification in France, a double-platinum certification in Belgium and Italy, and a triple-platinum certification in United Kingdom.

== Critical reception ==
Melody Maker complimented its "driller-killer Europop irresistibility". A reviewer from Music Week gave the song four out of five, writing, "A chart topper across Europe, this has similar appeal to Crystal Waters' "Gypsy Woman". That reached number two and, with the right exposure, this could, too." Pop Rescue called it a "great" song, noting "the handclaps, the beats, drum fills, whirling synths and that bassline, and of course that catchy 'ner ner ner ner-ner ner ner' section." They added it as "a fine specimen" of "90s dance". Dave Fawbert from ShortList described it as an "absolute, total banger", and "a song that the Beatles would have been proud to have written."

== Legal issues ==
In 2025, Gala revealed that in 1995 she had signed "a very unfair deal" with producer Max Moroldo that left her “[living] penniless in Brooklyn with friends in rented rooms” despite the song's enduring popularity. Gala eventually won the right to re-record the song. The re-recording was released in 2024, and it was remixed by American DJ and producer Diplo.

== Chart performance ==
"Freed from Desire" went on to become a huge hit all over Europe, becoming the singer's most successful single. It peaked at number one in Belgium (in both Flanders (5 weeks) and Wallonia (10 weeks)) and France (13 weeks), and entered the top 10 also in Denmark, Iceland, Ireland, Italy, the Netherlands and the United Kingdom. In the UK, the song reached number two on the UK Singles Chart on 3 August 1997. It spent 8 weeks inside the top 10 and 14 weeks in total in the top 75, while peaking at number four on the UK Dance Singles Chart in the same period. On the Eurochart Hot 100, "Freed from Desire" also peaked within the top 10, reaching its best position as number four in December 1996. Additionally, it was a top-20 hit in Austria, Finland, Germany and Switzerland. In West Asia, the song became a number-one hit in Israel, peaking at the top position for two weeks from 26 August 1997.

The single was awarded a diamond recording certification in France, a triple-platinum in United Kingdom, and a double-platinum certification in Belgium and Italy.

== Music video ==
The accompanying music video for "Freed from Desire" was filmed in Hamburg at the Speicherstadt under the direction of German director and photographer Nina Bittel. It was shot in a sepia tone filter and showed Gala being chased around by several different men. Other scenes feature the singer driving a 1962 Austin-Healey 3000.

== Other versions ==
In 2016, Gala recorded an acoustic version of "Freed from Desire" at Les Studios Saint Germain in Paris, for the movie Un homme à la hauteur directed by Laurent Tirard with Jean Dujardin.

== Track listings ==
CD single
No.	Title	Length
1.	"Freed from Desire" (Edit Mix)	3:21
2.	"Freed from Desire" (Full Vocals Mixx)	4:13

CD maxi / Europe
No.	Title	Length
1.	"Freed from Desire" (Radio Mix)	3:30
2.	"Freed from Desire" (Solid Base Remix)	5:30
3.	"Freed from Desire" (The Paradise Mix)	8:35
4.	"Freed from Desire" (Full Vocal Extended Mix)	4:17
5.	"Freed from Desire" (QFX Radio Edit)	3:51

CD maxi / Australia
No.	Title	Length
1.	"Freed from Desire" (Radio Mix)	3:32
2.	"Freed from Desire" (The Paradise Mix)	8:37
3.	"Freed from Desire" (Full Vocal Mix)	4:17
4.	"Freed from Desire" (Whistle Remix)	6:06
5.	"Freed from Desire" (The Soundlovers Remix)	5:57

12" maxi
No.	Title	Length
1.	"Freed from Desire" (Full Vocals Mixx)	4:13
2.	"Freed from Desire" (Edit Mix)	3:21
3.	"Freed from Desire" (The Paradise Mix)	8:35

CD maxi – Remixes
No.	Title	Length
1.	"Freed from Desire" (Short Mix)	3:35
2.	"Freed from Desire" (The Soundlovers Remix)	6:01
3.	"Freed from Desire" (Whistle Remix)	6:09

12" maxi – Remixes
No.	Title	Length
1.	"Freed from Desire" (The Soundlovers Remix)	5:52
2.	"Freed from Desire" (Whistle Remix)	6:00
3.	"Freed from Desire" (Video Mix)	3:28

12" maxi – Remixes
No.	Title	Length
1.	"Freed from Desire" (Mr. Jack Club Mix)	7:33
2.	"Freed from Desire" (Full Vocal Mix)	4:13
3.	"Freed from Desire" (Mr. Jack deja vu Dub)	5:01

12" maxi – Remixes
No.	Title	Length
1.	"Freed from Desire" (Mr. Jack Club Mix)	7:33
2.	"Freed from Desire" (Full Vocal Mix)	4:13
3.	"Freed from Desire" (Mr. Jack Deja Vu Dub)	5:01

12" maxi – U.K. Remixes
No.	Title	Length
1.	"Freed from Desire" (Allisters Full Vocal Mix)	7:05
2.	"Freed from Desire" (Mr. Jack Club Mix)	8:15
3.	"Freed from Desire" (Dillon & Dickins Mix)	8:41
4.	"Freed from Desire" (Original Mix)	4:13

== Charts ==
=== Weekly charts ===
Weekly chart performance for "Freed from Desire"
Chart (1996–1997)	Peak position
Austria (Ö3 Austria Top 40)	16
Belgium (Stichting Promuvl)	1
Belgium (Ultratop 50 Flanders)	1
Belgium (Ultratop 50 Wallonia)	1
Belgium Dance (Ultratop)	1
Denmark (IFPI)	7
Europe (Eurochart Hot 100)	4
Europe Border Breakers (Music & Media)	2
Finland (Suomen virallinen lista)	17
France (SNEP)	1
Germany (GfK)	14
Iceland (Íslenski Listinn Topp 40)	9
Ireland (IRMA)	2
Israel (Israeli Singles Chart)	1
Italy (Musica e dischi)	2
Netherlands (Dutch Top 40)	5
Netherlands (Single Top 100)	6
Scottish Singles Sales (Official Charts)	3
Sweden (Sverigetopplistan)	42
Switzerland (Schweizer Hitparade)	13
UK Singles (Official Charts)	2
UK Dance (Official Charts)	4

=== Year-end charts ===
1996 year-end chart performance for "Freed from Desire"
Chart (1996)	Rank
Belgium (Ultratop 50 Flanders)	65
Belgium (Ultratop 50 Wallonia)	3
Europe (Eurochart Hot 100)	60
France (SNEP)	3
Italy (Musica e dischi)	6

1997 year-end chart performance for "Freed from Desire"
Chart (1997)	Rank
Belgium (Ultratop 50 Flanders)	19
Belgium (Ultratop 50 Wallonia)	30
Europe (Eurochart Hot 100)	15
France (SNEP)	55
Germany (Media Control)	43
Israel (Israeli Singles Chart)	8
Netherlands (Dutch Top 40)	52
Netherlands (Single Top 100)	90
UK Singles (OCC)	17

2024 year-end chart performance for "Freed from Desire"
Chart (2024)	Rank
France (SNEP)	189

== Certifications and sales ==
Certifications for "Freed from Desire"
Region	Certification	Certified units/sales
Belgium (BRMA)	2× Platinum	100,000^{*}
Denmark (IFPI Danmark)	Gold	45,000^{‡}
France (SNEP)	Diamond	750,000^{*}
Germany (BVMI)	Platinum	600,000^{‡}
Italy (FIMI) sales since 2009	2× Platinum	200,000^{‡}
New Zealand (RMNZ)	Gold	15,000^{‡}
Spain (Promusicae)	Platinum	60,000^{‡}
United Kingdom (BPI)	3× Platinum	1,800,000^{‡}
Streaming
Greece (IFPI Greece)	Platinum	2,000,000^{†}
^{*} Sales figures based on certification alone.^{‡} Sales+streaming figures based on certification alone.^{†} Streaming-only figures based on certification alone.

== Drenchill and Indiiana version ==
"Freed from Desire"

Single by Drenchill featuring Indiiana
- Released: 2018
- Genre: Dance
- Length: 3:39
- Label: Sony Music
- Songwriters: Filippo Andrea Carmeni; Gala Rizzatto; Maurizio Molella
- Producer: Drenchill

Drenchill singles chronology
"Hey Hey" (2018)	"Freed from Desire" (2018)	"Allumé Allumé" (2019)

Music video
- "Freed from Desire" on YouTube

In 2018, Drenchill released a cover of "Freed from Desire". It reached number 1 in Poland and number 4 in the Commonwealth of Independent States.

=== Weekly charts ===
2018–2019 weekly chart performance for "Freed from Desire" by Drenchill
Chart (2018–2019)	Peak position
CIS Airplay (TopHit)	4
Poland Airplay (ZPAV)	1
Russia Airplay (TopHit)	4
Ukraine Airplay (TopHit)	3

2025 weekly chart performance for "Freed from Desire" by Drenchill
Chart (2025)	Peak position
Moldova Airplay (TopHit)	93

==== Year-end charts ====
2019 year-end chart performance for "Freed from Desire" by Drenchill
Chart (2019)	Position
Russia Airplay (TopHit)	17
Ukraine Airplay (TopHit)	29

2020 year-end chart performance for "Freed from Desire" by Drenchill
Chart (2020)	Position
Russia Airplay (TopHit)	98
Ukraine Airplay (TopHit)	77

2021 year-end chart performance for "Freed from Desire" by Drenchill
Chart (2021)	Position
CIS Airplay (TopHit)	165
Ukraine Airplay (TopHit)	145

=== Certifications ===
Certifications for "Freed from Desire" by Drenchill
Region	Certification	Certified units/sales
Poland (ZPAV)	4× Platinum	80,000^{‡}
^{‡} Sales+streaming figures based on certification alone.

== Usage in sport ==
The song has had a significant usage in association football, where fans from around the world have made their own iterations of the song with changed lyrics.

It has been used as a football chant by fans of Bohemian FC in Dublin as far back as April 2011, where at a game away to Sligo Rovers it was sung with the lyrics amended to "The Bohs have got no money, we've got a bag of E's." (Ecstasy) Reference was made to the chant in the Irish Independent at the time, who wrote "For 45 minutes the visiting fans – who clearly planned around dry Good Friday – roared out 1990s dance classic 'Freed From Desire' seemingly oblivious to their team being dismantled on the park" and was recorded by Sligo Rovers fans in the opposite stand.

The chorus was used for a football chant in 2012 by Stevenage F.C. fans for winger Luke Freeman as: "Freeman's on fire, your right back is terrified!" Bristol City then adopted the chant following the signing of Freeman from Stevenage in June 2014. Following that, in early 2016, Newcastle United supporters adapted the song for their striker Aleksandar Mitrović, the refrain being: "Mitro's on fire, your defence is terrified", which has also been used by fans of Fulham FC after his transfer there. However, Mitrović suffered poor form; the chant went viral in May of that year, as Wigan Athletic supporter Sean Kennedy uploaded on YouTube his version of "Freed from Desire" titled "Will Grigg's on Fire", in recognition of the recent goal-scoring feats of Will Grigg, a Wigan player. This version was recorded by dance producers Blonde under the alias DJ Kenno, and it reached No. 76 on the UK single chart. Fans from Northern Ireland also sang "Will Grigg's on Fire", notably during UEFA Euro 2016, as he played for Northern Ireland. Fans of Ireland, Wales, England, and France made their own versions of the song for their players, such as "Vardy's on Fire" and "Grizi's on Fire". It was later seen as the unofficial song of UEFA Euro 2016. Switzerland used the song as a goal song during the 2026 FIFA World Cup. During the 2026 World Cup, Norwegian fans chanted "The world's best player is named Erling Braut Haaland" (translated from Norwegian). It is also currently used as the goal song for Vancouver Whitecaps FC.

Gala herself has expressed support for the use of the song as a sports anthem, stating that "it’s such a beautiful thing that a song has an energy by itself":

Music and sport both gather people of different backgrounds together – a rich guy and a poor guy, they both love the same song, they both cheer for the same football team. It really brings people together from different backgrounds and countries.

Scottish mixed martial artist Chris Duncan frequently uses the song for his walkouts.

== Other usage ==
In October 2022, a video of fans singing about Will Grigg was re-captioned "Kerch Bridge on fire, your defence is terrified!" in the aftermath of the 2022 Crimean Bridge explosion. The video gained further traction in mid-2023, with at least one news channel mistaking it for Ukrainians celebrating.

The song was heavily used in the 2024–2025 Serbian students-led anti-corruption protests. In April 2025, on her Instagram profile Gala supported the protests with the message: "Proud to hear my music used by students protesting government corruption". Gala appeared on the 2025 Exit festival in Novi Sad, Serbia, opening the festival's 25th edition with her performance. After a sixteen-minute silence, which commemorated sixteen victims of the 2024 Novi Sad railway station canopy collapse, which sparked the protests, Gala walked out on stage with a group of Serbian students, sending a message in Serbian: "Stand up for your rights. Show that the people have the power. Pump it, bre".

== See also ==
- List of number-one singles of 1996 (France)
- Ultratop 40 number-one hits of 1996
- Ultratop 50 number-one hits of 1997
- Will Grigg
