= Fun Radio (Belgium) =

Private Belgian radio station

Belgium
- Broadcast area: Wallonia and Brussels
- Frequencies: 104.7 MHz (Brussels); 103.5 MHz (Charleroi); List of other areas

Programming
- Format: Contemporary R&B; Rhythm and blues Dance music Electro music House music

Ownership
- Owner: Benoit Dewinter (1/3); Leadercom-SC (1/3); Micro FM-SCRL (1/3)
- Sister stations: Fun Radio (France)

History
- First air date: 1989

Links
- Website: www.funradio.be

Fun Radio Belgique is a private Belgian radio station, broadcasting in Wallonia and Brussels. It is a private station with a dancefloor format, originally licensed from Fun Radio France. It has been broadcasting in French-speaking Belgium since 1989.

== History ==
In 1989, Benoît Sillard is designated by Robert Hersant to become CEO of Fun Radio. Sillard decides to boost the radio notably by the developing the station abroad. After Fun Radio Romania, Fun Radio Poland and Fun Radio Slovakia, Fun Radio Belgium was created.

Initially, the station broadcast around ten hours of locally produced programs in Belgium, but starting in 2009, all programs became locally produced.

Among radio stations targeting a young audience and focusing on dance music, Fun Radio, with a market share of around 4% (with peaks of about 4.5%), aimed to surpass NRJ, whose audience share was declining from 5%.

In January 2011, Guillaume Pley and his team left Fun Radio Belgium. The station organized a casting call to find a replacement, with candidates including MiKL (Michaël Espinho), Walid, Oli & Alvin, Evan, Vinz, and Jasmine. Each show was produced by Pierre Madalin. The casting was won by MiKL.

In May 2011, Fun Radio Belgium surpassed NRJ by 0.3 percentage points and achieved two records with a 5.2% market share and an average listening time of 129 minutes.

On 8 August 2011, Fun Radio Belgium's programming became 100% Belgian with the launch of MiKL à la Radio, the station's new morning show. The program was hosted by MiKL and co-presented by Toph and Audrey.

At the start of the 2013 season, Fun Radio Belgium made major changes to its programming schedule: Belgian listeners were now offered over seven hours of live call-in shows in the evening, starting with Vinz at 7 p.m., followed by MiKL, Toph, and Sandro at 11 p.m. for MiKL No Limit.

The morning show also saw changes, as MiKL à la Radio was replaced by Cyril dans la radio, hosted by Cyril, Audrey, and Fabien.

On 1 September 2014, Fun Radio Belgium adjusted its schedule once again. La Tribu d'Evan was moved to the morning slot, airing Monday to Friday from 6:00 to 9:30 a.m., while Cyril dans la radio took over the after-school slot starting at 5:00 p.m.

In September 2015, Bruno Guillon (broadcasting from France) took over the station's morning show. Audrey became the host of Happy Hour (5:00–8:00 p.m.).

In September 2017, Happy Hour was moved an hour earlier (4:00–7:00 p.m.) to better meet audience expectations. Samy became the new host of Fun Radio Connected (7:00–10:00 p.m.).

In June 2018, Fun Radio parted ways with Audrey and ended her Happy Hour program.

In September 2018, Samy and Chloé took over the 4:00–7:00 p.m. slot. The evenings began with Mike's live call-in show and continued with #ToutEstPossible from 11:00 p.m. to 1:00 a.m..

In August 2020, "Le Doc," who had hosted Lovin'Fun on Fun Radio until 2018, returned to the airwaves on August 24 with Love In Fun, broadcast Monday to Thursday from 8 p.m. to 10 p.m., co-hosted with MiKL. This marked the return of Christian Spitz to radio.

On March 30, 2021, broadcasting was interrupted around 11:50 a.m. due to a fire that broke out in the electrical systems of the server room located in the station’s basement. Firefighters and Sibelga gas company had to intervene to bring the fire under control. Unable to continue its regular programming, the station aired content from Fun Radio France for 48 hours.

In September 2022, Thomas, Mano, and Simon took over the afternoon drive show from 4 p.m. to 7 p.m. The program Love in Fun was renamed Fun For You and aired from 7 p.m. to 8 p.m. Evening programming was hosted by Djé from 8 p.m. to 10 p.m.

On December 21, 2023, the IPM Group announced in a press release that it had acquired the Fun Radio Belgium network. The group stated that it had purchased FM Développement, the company to which the CSA had granted the right to operate the FM and DAB+ networks used to broadcast Fun Radio. IPM also acquired a 50% stake in Fun Radio Belgium, which holds the broadcasting license granted by the French group M6. As a result, Fun Radio Belgium joined IPM's audiovisual and digital media division, which includes LN Radio and LN24.

== Frequencies ==
In 2008, the CSA granted new frequencies to Fun Radio Belgium as part of the 2008 Frequency Plan project. Fun Radio Belgium was assigned Urban Network 1 (U1). On 15 November 2018, Fun Radio Belgium began broadcasting via DAB+ in the Wallonia and Brussels regions.

Fun Radio Belgium broadcasts on the following frequencies:

- Arlon – 107.5
- Ath – 95.4
- Bastogne – 92.9
- Brussels – 104.7
- Charleroi – 103.5
- Dinant – 106.6
- Gembloux – 89.2
- Huy – 98.8
- La Louvière – 107.3
- Liège – 99.0
- Marche-en-Famenne – 101.2
- Mons – 93.9
- Namur – 107.5
- Nivelles – 90.6
- Sambreville – 107.2
- Soignies – 99.7
- Tournai – 97.4
- Verviers – 105.7
- Waremme – 106.4
- Wavre, Louvain-la-Neuve – 105.5

== See also ==
- Fun Radio, the French version.
- Fun Radio Slovakia, the Slovak version.
