= Qaleh-ye Aslanian =

Qaleh-ye Aslanian قلعه اصلانيان
- Village
- Location within Iran
- Coordinates: 37°25′34″N 48°04′02″E
- Country: Iran
- Province: East Azerbaijan
- County: Meyaneh
- Bakhsh: Kaghazkonan
- Rural District: Kaghazkonan-e Shomali

Population (2006)
  - Total: 32
- Time zone: UTC+3:30 (IRST)
  - Summer (DST): UTC+4:30 (IRDT)

Qaleh-ye Aslanian (Persian: قلعه اصلانيان, also Romanized as Qal‘eh-ye Aşlānīān; also known as Gala, Kalāt, and Qal‘eh) is a village in Kaghazkonan-e Shomali Rural District, Kaghazkonan District, Meyaneh County, East Azerbaijan Province, Iran. As of the 2006 census, its population was 32, with 11 families.
