= Come into My Life (Gala song) =

1997 single by Gala

Single by Gala

from the album Come into My Life
- Released: November 1997
- Length: 3:22
- Label: Nitelite
- Songwriters: Gala; Molella; Phil Jay
- Producers: Molella; Phil Jay

Gala singles chronology
"Let a Boy Cry" (1997)	"Come into My Life" (1997)	"Suddenly" (1997)

Music video
- "Come into My Life" on YouTube

"Come into My Life" is a song by Italian singer-songwriter Gala. She co-wrote the song with its producers, Molella and Phil Jay. It was released in November 1997 by label Nitelite as the third single from her debut album, Come into My Life (1997), and achieved success in Europe, peaking at number one in Italy and entering the top 10 in Belgium, France and Greece. The accompanying music video was directed by Italian director Pietro Falini.

== Critical reception ==
American student newspaper Columbia Daily Spectator wrote that the song "sounds like ifs been ejected from a blender on high speed. The fashionably detached vocalist's singsong is more seductive than any gasping oh-baby could hope to be." A reviewer from Music Week stated that the "Italian diva" is back with a single, "in which a quirky intro moves into a funky chorus with a typically pedestrian vocal." In a retrospective review, Pop Rescue noted that "some acidy synths and a pumping beat usher" in the track, adding that Gala’s vocals here "continue their minimal wanderings."

== Chart performance ==
"Come into My Life" peaked at number one in Italy and topping the maxi-singles chart of Spain. It was also a top-10 hit in Belgium (Flanders and Wallonia), France and Greece while entering the top 20 in Finland, as well as on the Eurochart Hot 100, where it reached number 20 in December 1997. In the United Kingdom, "Come into My Life" reached number 38 on the UK Singles Chart, number 12 on the UK Dance Singles Chart, and number two on the UK Indie Chart. The single received a gold record in France, after 250,000 units were sold.

== Track listings ==
- 12-inch single
1. "Come Into My Life" (mix) – 6:14
2. "Come Into My Life" (club) – 5:05
3. "Come Into My Life" (edit) – 3:22
- CD single
1. "Come Into My Life" (edit mix) – 3:22
2. "Come Into My Life" (edit) – 3:22
- CD maxi
1. "Come Into My Life" (edit mix) – 3:25
2. "Come Into My Life" (edit) – 3:26
3. "Come Into My Life" (club mix) – 5:11
4. "Come Into My Life" (mix) – 5:19

== Charts ==
=== Weekly charts ===
Weekly chart performance for "Come into My Life"
Chart (1997–1998)	Peak position
Belgium (Ultratop 50 Flanders)	6
Belgium (Ultratop 50 Wallonia)	4
Europe (Eurochart Hot 100)	20
Finland (Suomen virallinen lista)	11
France (SNEP)	10
Greece (IFPI)	4
Italy (Musica e dischi)	1
Italy Airplay (Music & Media)	7
Netherlands (Dutch Top 40)	32
Netherlands (Single Top 100)	36
Scottish Singles Sales (Official Charts)	32
Spain Maxi-Singles (AFYVE)	1
UK Singles (Official Charts)	38
UK Dance (Official Charts)	12
UK Indie (Official Charts)	2

=== Year-end charts ===
1997 year-end chart performance for "Come into My Life"
Chart (1997)	Position
Belgium (Ultartop 50 Flanders)	70
Belgium (Ultratop 50 Wallonia)	39
Brazil Airplay (Crowley)	95

1998 year-end chart performance for "Come into My Life"
Chart (1998)	Position
Europe Border Breakers (Music & Media)	48

== Certifications ==
Certifications for "Come into My Life"
Region	Certification	Certified units/sales
Belgium (BRMA)	Platinum	50,000^{*}
France (SNEP)	Gold	250,000^{*}
^{*} Sales figures based on certification alone.
