= Gala potato =

Potato variety

Gala
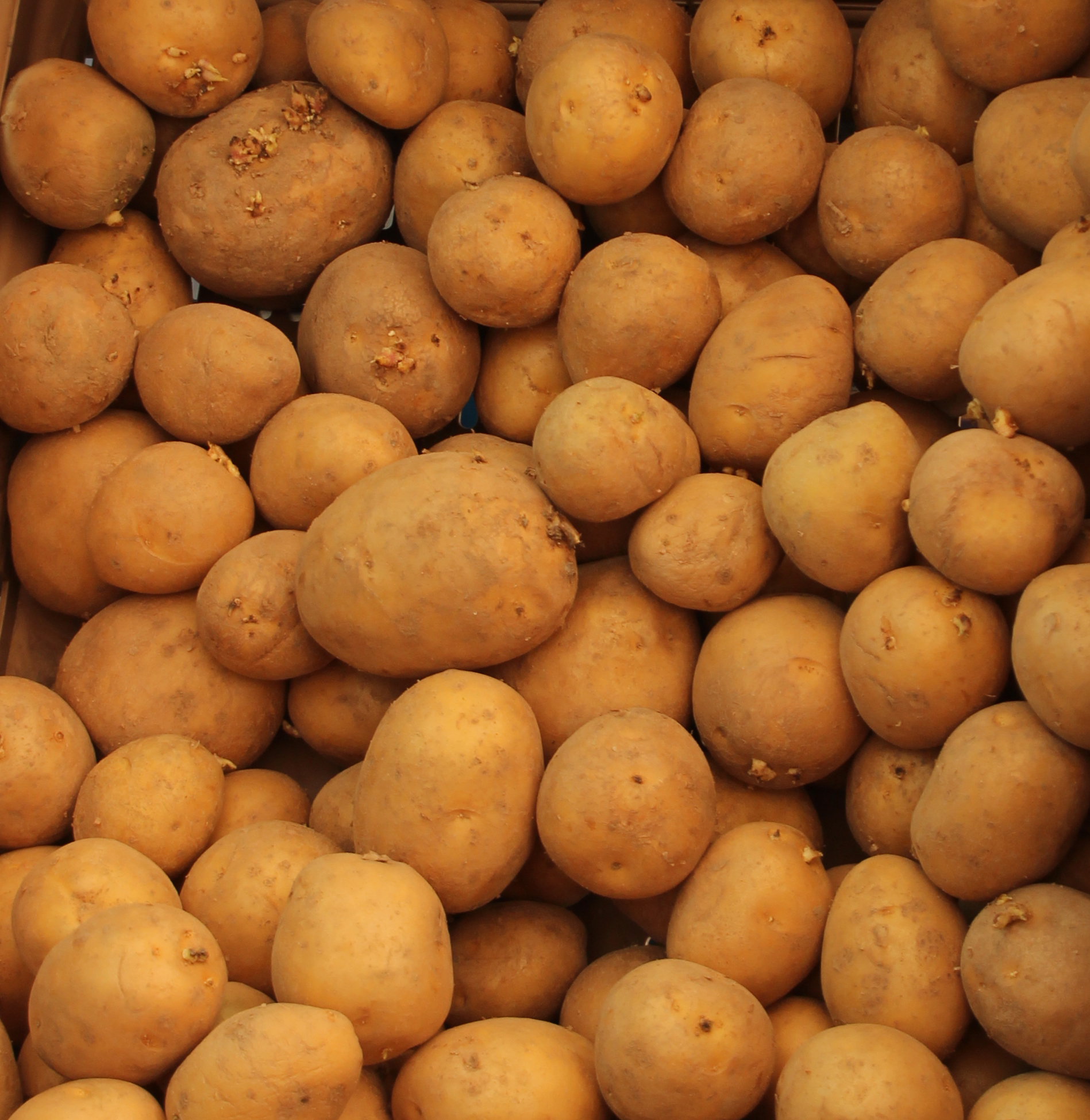
- Genus: Solanum
- Species: Solanum tuberosum
- Cultivar: Gala

Gala is an early-ripening firm-fleshed edible potato, for which good eating and keeping qualities are claimed. It was developed by the Groß Lüsewitz-based plant breeder Norika. In 2010, it was chosen as Thuringia's potato of the year in a public contest to which nearly 1000 consumers contributed, and in which Laura was second place.

== Tuber properties ==
The potato has typically a roughly oval form with shallow eyes which makes it particularly suitable for mechanical peeling. Its yield per plant is relatively high, but a good water supply is vital. When cooked, the tuber suffers from only very minor discolouring. The variety has a bright yellow skin colour and a medium yellow flesh colour. It also has a very long dormancy period and it normally produced for the fresh market.

== Resistances ==
This variety is heat and drought resistant, as well as resistant to potato cyst nematode. It is also resistant to Pallida types 2 and 3. It has good resistance to foliar and soil-borne diseases and it also has good scab and blackleg resistance.

== Planting ==
Planting, using chitted seed potatoes, can be done at a depth some 2 cm deeper than normal since the plants are compact and easily lifted. To support irrigation requirements and nutritional qualities, Gala is also suitable for cultivation in relatively light soils. A protective dressing to counter Rhizoctonia is recommended.
