= Gala, Croatia =

Settlement in Split-Dalmatia County, Croatia

Gala
- Settlement
- Interactive map of Gala
- Location within Croatia
- Coordinates: 43°43′19″N 16°42′32″E
- Country: Croatia
- County: Split-Dalmatia
- Municipality: Otok

Area
  - Total: 14.3 km^{2} (5.5 sq mi)

Population (2021)
  - Total: 806
  - Density: 56.4/km^{2} (146/sq mi)
- Time zone: UTC+1 (CET)
  - Summer (DST): UTC+2 (CEST)
- Postal code: 21238 Otok
- Area code: +385 (0)21

Gala is a settlement in the Municipality of Otok in Croatia. In 2021, its population was 806.

== Demographics ==
Gala: Population trends 1857–2021
v

population	376	387	400	492	562	733	696	806	889	950	902	949	1086	1087	1016	896	806
	1857	1869	1880	1890	1900	1910	1921	1931	1948	1953	1961	1971	1981	1991	2001	2011	2021

Sources: Croatian Bureau of Statistics publications
