= Gala Group =

Gala Group may refer to:

- Gala Group (geology), a series of rock strata in southern Scotland
- Gala Coral Group, a commercial betting and gambling company
