= Megalotica =

Scientific classification
- Kingdom: Animalia
- Phylum: Arthropoda
- Class: Insecta
- Order: Lepidoptera
- Family: Geometridae
- Subfamily: Larentiinae
- Genus: Megalotica; Zimmerman, 1958

Synonyms
- Gela Zimmerman, 1958

Genus of moths

Megalotica is a genus of moths in the family Geometridae described by Zimmerman in 1958.

== Species ==
- Megalotica aphoristis (Meyrick, 1899)
- Megalotica holombra (Meyrick, 1899)
