= Megalotica holombra =

Scientific classification
- Kingdom: Animalia
- Phylum: Arthropoda
- Class: Insecta
- Order: Lepidoptera
- Family: Geometridae
- Genus: Megalotica
- Species: M. holombra

Binomial name
- Megalotica holombra (Meyrick, 1899)

Synonyms
- Dasyuris holombra Meyrick, 1899

Species of moth

Megalotica holombra is a moth of the family Geometridae. It was first described by Edward Meyrick in 1899. It is endemic to the Hawaiian volcano Haleakalā on the island of Maui.

It is almost entirely brown with a bronze reflection. The lines on the forewings are not strongly marked, and the hindwings and under surfaces of the wings are concolorous.

Robert Cyril Layton Perkins (1913) noted: "this conspicuous dark-coloured, day-flying moth, of which two specimens are recorded, I observed in hundreds, if not thousands on one occasion, flying in the forest on Maui, but being always hampered with a gun and much occupied with birds, I neglected to catch a series and did not again have the chance."
