= Come into My Life (Gala album) =

- European cover

Studio album by Gala
- Released: 17 November 1997
- Recorded: 1996
- Studios: Planet Studio, Milan, Italy
- Genre: Dance
- Length: 35:12
- Label: Do It Yourself S.R.L.
- Producers: Molella & Phil Jay

Gala chronology
Come into My Life (1997)	Gala Remixes (2000)

Singles from Come into My Life
- 1. "Freed from Desire" Released: 1996; 2. "Let a Boy Cry" Released: January 1997; 3. "Come into My Life" Released: 10 November 1997; 4. "Suddenly" Released: May 1998

Come into My Life is the debut studio album by Italian dance music singer Gala, released in November 1997. The album was recorded at the Planet Studio in Milan, Italy. Four singles were released: "Come into My Life", "Freed from Desire", "Suddenly" and "Let a Boy Cry".

== Reception ==
Professional ratings
Review scores
Source	Rating
AllMusic	1.5/5 stars
Sunday Mirror	7/10 stars

The UK channel 4 teletext page 'Planet Sound' gave the album 3 out of 5, praising Gala for the "surprising variety". Of the few high-profile reviews available to read online, the AllMusic review by Dean Carlson awarded the album 1.5 stars stating "Gala was one of the first pop stars to graft a classical Italian outlook onto old-school acid techno. With a past including art school and a name taken from Salvador Dalí's wife, Gala's background contrasted sharply with the Dubstar dance-pop of hits like "Let a Boy Cry" and "Freed From Desire" as well as her slightly androgynous good looks and flat, nasal singing style.

The Gipsy Kings' Tonino Baliardo appeared on "Summer Eclipse", and the title track is a delightful second summer-of-love jam, but Gala lacked confidence and range."

== Track listing ==
All tracks are written by Gala, Molella & Phil Jay.

No.	Title	Length
1.	"Keep the Secret"	4:22
2.	"Come into My Life"	3:22
3.	"Suddenly"	3:55
4.	"Freed from Desire" (slow version)	3:50
5.	"Let a Boy Cry"	3:20
6.	"Summer Eclipse"	4:56
7.	"Dance or Die"	3:30
8.	"Come into My Life" (Molella & Phil Jay Edit)	3:24
9.	"10 O'Clock"	3:30
10.	"Freed from Desire"	3:21
11.	"Let a Boy Cry" (Motiv 8 Radio Edit)	4:23
Total length:		35:12

== Personnel ==
- Tonino Baliardo – guitar, guitar arrangements
- Gala – arranger, mixing, vocals
- Maurizio Molella – arranger, mixing, producer
- Phil Jay – arranger, mixing, producer

== Chart performance ==
Chart (1997–98)	Peak position
Belgian Albums (Ultratop Flanders)	28
Belgian Albums (Ultratop Wallonia)	16
Dutch Albums (Album Top 100)	20
French Albums (SNEP)	32
Swiss Albums (Schweizer Hitparade)	49

== Certifications ==
Region	Certification	Certified units/sales
France (SNEP)	Gold	100,000^{*}
^{*} Sales figures based on certification alone.
