= Let a Boy Cry =

1997 single by Gala

Single by Gala

from the album Come into My Life
- Released: January 1997
- Genre: Eurodance
- Length: 3:20
- Label: Nitelite
- Songwriters: Maurizio Molella; Filippo Andrea Carmeni; Gala Rizzatto
- Producers: DJ Molella; Phil Jay

Gala singles chronology
"Freed from Desire" (1996)	"Let a Boy Cry" (1997)	"Come into My Life" (1997)

Music video
- "Let a Boy Cry" on YouTube

"Let a Boy Cry" is a song written and recorded by Italian singer-songwriter Gala. It was released in January 1997, by label Nitelite, as the second single from her debut album, Come into My Life (1997). Gala co-wrote the song with Filippo Andrea Carmeni and Maurizio Molella, who both produced the track. According to Gala, the song describes how in a society where men would not be ridiculed for their sensitivity, women could be freer.

"Let a Boy Cry" achieved success in Europe, peaking at number one in Belgium (Flanders and Wallonia), France, Israel and Italy, receiving a platinum record in Belgium and France. On the Eurochart Hot 100, "Let a Boy Cry" reached number three. The accompanying music video was co-directed by Gala and filmed in Venice, Italy.

== Critical reception ==
British magazine Music Week gave the song a full score of five out of five, adding, "Already a massive hit in Europe, Gala's second single is easily as catchy as the platinum 'Freed from Desire'. A broad range of mixes should guarantee strong radio airplay." Chris Finan from their RM Dance Update rated it four out of five, commenting that "[it's] needless to say [that] UK demand will be as vigorous on its impending release." Pop Rescue felt that the track "has a sense of dance about it. At times Gala's vocals sound a bit flat and not unlike those of Divine. However, musically this song definitely lifts the tempo and sound up somewhat, and Gala's vocals fit perfectly in the chorus."

== Chart performance ==
"Let a Boy Cry" was a major hit in several countries and successful on the charts in Europe. It peaked at number-one in Belgium (4 weeks in Flanders and 7 weeks in Wallonia), France (2 weeks), Italy and Spain. The single also made it to a very respectable number three on the Eurochart Hot 100, and number 11 in the United Kingdom. In the latter, it reached that position in its first week on the UK Singles Chart on 30 November 1997. But on the UK Indie Chart, it was an even bigger hit, peaking at number one. Additionally, it was a top-20 hit also in Ireland and Scotland, and a top-30 hit in Switzerland. Outside Europe, it became a number-one hit in Israel, peaking at the top position for three weeks from 11 March 1997. It spent 8 weeks inside the Israeli top 30. "Let a Boy Cry" was awarded with a platinum record in France.

== Music video ==
The music video for "Let a Boy Cry" was directed by director Philippe Antonello, Luca Bigazzi and Gala, and produced by Paolo Soravia. The black-and-white video was shot in Venice in San Mark's square during the Carnival. In a 2014 interview with DNA Magazine, Gala said about the video, "It's also funny now when I watch my video for 'Let a Boy Cry'. At the time it was a real problem with Vatican City in Italy because there were two boys kissing in it in a really sweet way. They were actually brothers, the two guys, and I asked them to kiss each other, as I was also co-director. They look like a couple, which was my intention, and people were bothered by it. Now it's the Same Love era and no one would blink! Yes, but there are still many things to change. For me they are not gay or lesbian issues but human rights issues."

== Track listings ==
- 12-inch single
1. "Let a Boy Cry" (Full Vocals mix) – 5:06
2. "Let a Boy Cry" (edit mix) – 3:20
3. "Let a Boy Cry" (the Glittering mix) – 7:16
- CD single
1. "Let a Boy Cry" (edit mix) – 3:20
2. "Let a Boy Cry" (Full Vocals mix) – 5:06
- CD maxi
1. "Let a Boy Cry" (edit mix) – 3:20
2. "Let a Boy Cry" (Full Vocals mix) – 5:06
3. "Let a Boy Cry" (the Glittering mix) – 7:16

== Charts ==
=== Weekly charts ===
Chart (1997)	Peak position
Belgium (Ultratop 50 Flanders)	1
Belgium (Ultratop 50 Wallonia)	1
Europe (Eurochart Hot 100)	3
France (SNEP)	1
Ireland (IRMA)	17
Israel (Israeli Singles Chart)	1
Italy (FIMI)	1
Netherlands (Dutch Top 40)	9
Netherlands (Single Top 100)	11
Scottish Singles Sales (Official Charts)	11
Spain Maxi-Singles (AFYVE)	8
Switzerland (Schweizer Hitparade)	23
UK Singles (Official Charts)	11
UK Indie (Official Charts)	1

=== Year-end charts ===
Chart (1997)	Position
Belgium (Ultratop 50 Flanders)	12
Belgium (Ultratop 50 Wallonia)	9
Europe (Eurochart Hot 100)	18
France (SNEP)	13
Netherlands (Dutch Top 40)	56
Netherlands (Single Top 100)	99
Romania (Romanian Top 100)	39

== Certifications ==
Region	Certification	Certified units/sales
Belgium (BRMA)	Platinum	50,000^{*}
France (SNEP)	Platinum	500,000^{*}
^{*} Sales figures based on certification alone.
