= Galà (video game) =

2022 educational mobile video game

- Developer: Kendikorp
- Designer: Audrey Stinson
- Platform: Android
- Release: 2022
- Genres: Educational, Adventure
- Mode: Single-player

Galà is a mobile video game developed by the Filipino indie studio Kendikorp. The title is derived from the Tagalog word for "travel" or "wander". It is an educational simulation game that functions as a virtual field trip around the Philippines. The project was the recipient of the first Game Development Grant awarded by the Cultural Center of the Philippines (CCP). The game is often categorized alongside other local educational titles that focus on Philippine history and culture.

== Gameplay ==
In Galà, players assume the role of a student traveling to various Philippine regions. The gameplay involves exploring different locations to discover cultural artifacts and local history. Players travel using a specialized jeepney that is fueled by milk tea. The game utilizes a pixel art visual style.

The player is accompanied by non-player characters (NPCs) who act as schoolmates. To progress, the player must brainstorm ideas with these NPCs to unlock discoveries. These discoveries include real-world cultural items, such as the kubing (jaw harp), and figures from Philippine mythology, such as the Bakunawa. The game is designed to be self-paced and does not use strict timers.

== Development ==
Galà was created by Audrey Stinson, the founder of the indie studio Kendikorp. It was the studio's first commercial project. Stinson was inspired to create the game after a family trip to Puerto Princesa, where she enjoyed learning about local aquatic life. The concept was further influenced by the COVID-19 pandemic, which prevented students from attending physical field trips for two years. Stinson stated that the goal of the game is to "expose rather than educate" players about Filipino culture.

The development was funded through the Cultural Center of the Philippines' Game Development Grant. While the game was originally planned for the PC platform, the developer shifted to mobile to make it more accessible to students. The game's art assets were created through a collaboration with 20 Filipino pixel artists. Stinson removed earlier mini-games and time limits to ensure the experience remained low-stress for players.

== Release ==
The game was released for Android devices via Google Play. In January 2025, Galà was featured as part of the "Palaro" section at the Pasinaya Open House Festival, the country's largest multi-arts festival hosted by the CCP. The exhibition highlighted the game as a way to travel and view Philippine landmarks digitally.
