= Nikola Rušinović =

Croatian physician (1908–1993)

- Nikola Rušinović

NDH ambassador to Bulgaria
- In office April 1944 – September 1944
- Leader: Ante Pavelić
- Preceded by: Đuro Jakčin
- Succeeded by: Position abolished

Personal details
- Born: 13 November 1908 Philadelphia, Pennsylvania, United States
- Died: 28 August 1993 (aged 84) Philadelphia, Pennsylvania, United States
- Party: Ustaše
- Spouse: Marija Vujašinović
- Children: 2
- Relatives: Mark Russinovich (grandson)
- Occupation: Diplomat
- Profession: Physician; Psychiatrist

Nikola Rušinović (13 November 1908 – 28 August 1993) was a Croatian-American physician and diplomat who served as the first unofficial representative of the Independent State of Croatia (NDH) to the Holy See from 1941 to 1942, during World War II.

Born in Philadelphia, he resettled in his mother's native Dalmatia as a child and obtained his MD at the Zagreb Faculty of Medicine. Following the creation of the NDH in April 1941, he joined the puppet state's civil service. In Rome, his primary objective was to convince the Vatican to recognize the NDH. Amidst concern from certain high-ranking Vatican officials about reports of atrocities, he attempted to justify the NDH's policy of forced conversions of Serbs to Catholicism, but was hindered by his diplomatic inexperience and was ultimately unable to convince the Holy See to issue a formal recognition. Until February 1943, he served as a liaison to the Italian Second Army headquarters and helped coordinate anti-Partisan operations in occupied Yugoslavia. He later served as the NDH's consul general in Munich and its ambassador to Bulgaria.

After the war, Rušinović was recruited by American military intelligence and the Yugoslav authorities' request for his extradition was ignored by the U.S Military Government in Europe. In the immediate post-war years, he practised internal medicine in Argentina. He settled in the United States in 1947, and later underwent special training in psychiatry, becoming a professor at the University of Louisville School of Medicine in Kentucky and the chief of the psychiatric department at a Veterans Affairs hospital in Louisville under the name Nicholas Russinovich. Following his retirement, he was appointed professor emeritus of psychiatry at the University of Louisville and was made a life member of the American Psychiatric Association. He died in Philadelphia in 1993 and his memoirs were published posthumously.

== Early life ==
Nikola Rušinović was born in Philadelphia, Pennsylvania, on 13 November 1908 to Marko and Francisca Rušinović (née Kostović). Both of his parents were originally from the Dalmatian island of Drvenik Veli. He resettled in his mother's native Dalmatia as a child, completed his secondary education in Split's First Gymnasium and attended the University of Zagreb's Faculty of Medicine between 1929 and 1934. He completed his residency at a hospital in Šibenik from 1934 to 1935, and worked at the same hospital's neuropsychiatric ward from 1935 to 1936. (Note: Authors Vladimir Dugački and Milan Pojić contend that this was in the nearby town of Biograd na Moru.) He completed his specialization in internal medicine at the Forlanini Institute in Rome. From 1936 to 1939, he worked at the Sisters of Charity Hospital in Zagreb, specializing in internal medicine. (Note: According to Rušinović's autobiography, the hospital was operated by the Society of Saint Vincent de Paul.) On 5 June 1937, he married Marija Vujašinović, with whom he had two children. He published his first papers in Liječnički vjesnik ("Medical Journal") the following year.

== World War II ==
Following the Axis invasion of Yugoslavia in April 1941 and the establishment of the Independent State of Croatia (Croatian: Nezavisna država Hrvatska; NDH) under the rule of Ustaše leader Ante Pavelić, Rušinović became involved with the puppet state's government. On 30 May 1941, he departed by train for Rome with a group of Croatian diplomats. In August 1941, he was appointed as an advisor to the NDH's informal mission in Rome, and as a representative to the Holy See. Despite him carrying two letters appointing him as the puppet state's "unofficial" representative, the Vatican's Secretariat of State received him as "a private intermediary with no official or unofficial capacity". From the beginning, it became evident that Rušinović was ill-equipped to handle the role due to his lack of diplomatic experience, and this drew the criticism of the high-ranking Croatian Franciscan Dominik Mandić. Nevertheless, Rušinović nurtured close ties with the one-time Apostolic Nunciature to Yugoslavia, Ettore Felici, as well as Edoardo Prettner Cippico, the Secretariat of State's archivist, both of whom provided him with insight into the Vatican's intentions.

In the late summer of 1941, a report describing the massacres committed by the Ustaše against the NDH's Serb population reached the Vatican. Rušinović denied that the NDH had perpetrated any atrocities and assured Monsignor Giovanni Montini, later to become Pope Paul VI, that the acts of violence described had been committed by the communist Partisans, claiming they were intended to tarnish the image of the Ustaše movement and the Catholic faith. Between September 1941 and February 1942, nearly 100,000 Serbs in the NDH were forcibly converted to Roman Catholicism. Catholicized Serbs were formally reclassified as Croats, but even after converting, many were not spared from Ustaše violence. Rušinović characterized the conversions as "a priceless gift to the Holy See" and described them as the "rectification of past errors, the return to the only true Church, the return of the schismatics to the true faith."

According to Rušinović, in February 1942, Cardinal Luigi Maglione granted him a private audience in which he told him that both he and Pope Pius XII wished to formally recognize the NDH but could not do so during wartime. Around this time, several high-ranking Vatican officials expressed concern about the violence taking place in the NDH. In early March, Monsignor Montini demanded to know, "What's happening in Croatia? Why such clamor ... all over the world? Can all these crimes really have taken place? And is it true that prisoners are being mistreated?" Rušinović characterized the reports as enemy propaganda and reminded Montini that a delegation of clergymen—including Stjepan Lacković and Giuseppe Masucci, secretaries to the Archbishop of Zagreb Aloysius Stepinac and abbot Giuseppe Marcone, respectively—had visited the largest Ustaše concentration camps the previous month. He suggested that Montini ask this delegation for an assessment of the prisoners' treatment. (Note: The scholars Pino Adriano and Giorgio Cingolani note that the administrators at the Jasenovac concentration camp had been informed of Lacković and Masucci's visit beforehand, and "had arranged for everything to seem within the law, so that the visitors would be left with a positive impression.") Rušinović also met with Monsignor Tardini, who assured him that the Croatian state was young and that it was not "surprising" that it had made "mistakes" which the NDH's enemies would be eager to exploit.

Conversely, Rušinović had a tense relationship with French cardinal Eugene Tisserant, who expressed indignation about Ustaše atrocities and often rebuked Rušinović personally. He had three meetings with him on 6 March, 20 March, and 27 May 1942. In the first, Tisserant condemned the Franciscans' involvement in Ustaše atrocities, citing the case of Father Šimić of Knin, who had taken part in attacks against the Eastern Orthodox population. "I know for sure that even the Franciscans of Herzegovina have behaved atrociously," the cardinal said. "Father Šimić, with a revolver in his hand, led an armed gang and destroyed Orthodox churches. No civilised and cultured man can behave like that." (Note: The historian Jozo Tomasevich described Tisserant as "a determined opponent of the Axis powers and all their creations, including the Ustasha state". Adriano and Cingolani write, "As far as may be gleaned from the documents, Cardinal Eugène Tisserant was the only one in the Vatican to voice, albeit in private form, indignation for all that was happening and compassion for the victims.") Rušinović denied the Ustaše had done any of what Tisserant described, such as the destruction of Serbian Orthodox churches, claiming these accusations had been "deftly circulated by Croatia's enemies." When Tisserant countered with documentary evidence, Rušinović responded: "It's all falsified, pure fabrication." Annoyed by his attitude, Tisserant later complained to two Croatian Catholic priests, "Did the Croatian state not have another snotty-nosed diplomat more suited to be sent to the Vatican than Rušinović?" Tisserant and Rušinović's final meeting was even more heated. The cardinal accused the Ustaše of detaining as many as 20,000 Serbs in one concentration camp alone and of having already killed many others, adding, "It's hard to see what Croats hold against Serbs, when they behave even worse."

In early May 1942, Rušinović met with Archbishop Stepinac at San Girolamo dei Croati. They discussed Stepinac's earlier meeting with Maglione, during which the Archbishop had presented Maglione with a favourable report on the situation in the NDH. On 5 May 1942, Croatian foreign minister Mladen Lorković wrote in the Foreign Ministry's logbook, "Councilor Rušinović reports that Archbishop Stepinac brought with him to the Vatican a written report about the situation in Croatia, which is so positive that even the Poglavnik [Pavelić] himself could sign it." On 9 May 1942, Rušinović sent a letter to his superiors in Zagreb in which he praised Stepinac for his vociferous defence of the NDH:

As you must know, His Grace Stepinac has now returned to Zagreb after a twelve-day visit to Rome. He was in fine form and took a pugnacious attitude to all the enemies of the State! He submitted to the Holy Father a nine-page type-written report. He showed it to me and I can assure you it stands for our point of view. In attacking the Serbs, Chetniks and Communists, he has found things to say which even I had not thought of. No-one will be allowed to attack the Independent State of Croatia and show the Croatian people in a bad light. This was precisely the reason why he went to Rome, in order to stigmatise the lies that have spread in regard to the Holy See.

Rušinović's efforts to persuade the Vatican to officially recognize the NDH were ultimately unsuccessful. In June 1942, he was appointed as an envoy and minister plenipotentiary at the Ministry of Foreign Affairs. The following month, shortly before his departure from Rome, he was granted a brief, private audience with the Pope in which the pontiff blessed Rušinović, his family, and Croatia. The last matter Rušinović dealt with before his transfer was the diplomatic dispute surrounding the Holy See's appointment of Petar Čule and Josip Šimrak as bishops of Mostar and Križevci, respectively. Pavelić expressed opposition to their appointment because he had not been consulted. After the Pope threatened to excommunicate him, he ultimately assented, albeit begrudgingly. On 1 October, Rušinović was succeeded as a representative to the Holy See by Ervin Lobković (German: Erwin Lobkowicz), who for several years had been a Participating Privy Chamberlain of the Sword and Cape and whose familial ties to the Austrian aristocracy spelled a greater likelihood of being granted private audiences with the Pope.

Until February 1943, Rušinović served as a liaison to the Italian Second Army headquarters in Sušak. In this capacity, he was responsible for organizing joint anti-Partisan operations with the Italians. From July 1943 to March 1944, he served as the NDH's consul general in Munich, and from April to September 1944, as its ambassador to Bulgaria. The ambassador before him was Đuro Jakčin.

== Post-war years and death ==
After the war, the Western Allies declined most of socialist Yugoslavia's requests to extradite erstwhile Axis collaborators. A British Foreign Office official at the time wrote, "Some of them are clearly collaborators of the blackest dye; but the Yugoslav request also covers others who may well be properly considered as political opponents of the present Yugoslav regime rather than as traitors to the Yugoslav state." A request by the Yugoslav War Crimes Liaison Detachment for Rušinović's extradition was one of many that was turned down by the legal office of the U.S Military Government in Europe. In Rušinović's case, the request was rejected without any explanation. According to a classified note found attached to Rušinović's State Department file and addressed to senior American diplomat James Williams Riddleberger, Rušinović had been recruited by American military intelligence. In June 1947, the counsellor of the American embassy in Belgrade, John Moors Cabot, wrote a cable back to Washington expressing "disgust" that the Western Allies appeared to be employing "the same men we so strongly criticized the Fascists for using." He continued, "It is crystal clear even on the basis of material available in this embassy's files that we have flouted our own commitments and that by our attitude we are protecting not only Quislings but also [those who] have been guilty of terrible crimes committed in Yugoslavia." He added that "we are apparently conniving with the Vatican and Argentina to get guilty people to haven in the latter country." The State Department legal advisor's office subsequently attached a note to Cabot's telegram chastising him for being "misinformed" and for not having "estimated the situation correctly".

In the immediate post-war years, Rušinović practised internal medicine in Argentina. He resettled in the United States in 1947. Accompanying him were his wife and their two children. After being licensed to practise medicine in Kentucky under the name Nicholas Russinovich, he worked at a tuberculosis clinic in Glasgow. At the age of 53, he underwent special training in psychiatry. He later became a professor at the University of Louisville School of Medicine in Kentucky and the chief of the psychiatric department at a Veterans Affairs hospital in Louisville. His daughter Jolanda went on to become a professor of linguistics at the University of Texas at Austin, whereas his son Nikola was appointed as an assistant professor at the University of Alabama, opened a radiology clinic in Pittsburgh and became the father of tech entrepreneur Mark Russinovich.

Following his retirement, Rušinović was appointed professor emeritus of psychiatry at the University of Louisville. He received a flattering profile in Father Raymond Flanagan's 1979 Christian devotional Forty Years Behind the Wall, which contended that he had been imprisoned at Dachau and made no mention of his role as a prominent Axis collaborator. In 1986, Rušinović became a life member of the American Psychiatric Association. He was also a member of the Croatian Academy of America. Having managed to complete his memoirs before his death, he died in Philadelphia on 28 August 1993. The following year, he received a posthumous commendation from Croatian President Franjo Tuđman for financially contributing to the reconstruction of the Embassy of Croatia in Washington, D.C. His memoirs were published posthumously.

== See also ==
- Dragutin Kamber
- Ivo Omrčanin
