= Soirée disco =

1996 single by Boris

Single by Boris

from the album Boris
- Language: French
- English title: "Disco Night"
- Released: 1996
- Label: Black Out, Versailles
- Songwriter(s): Bruno van Garsse, M. de San Antonio, Philippe Dhondt, Benoît Marissal
- Producer(s): Bruno van Garsse, Philippe Dhondt

Boris singles chronology
"Soirée disco" (1996)	"Miss Camping" (1996)

Alternative cover
- Remixes

"Soirée disco" (English: "Disco Night") is a song by French DJ Philippe Dhondt under the pseudonym of Boris. It was released as the first single from his eponymous debut album in 1996. It achieved a success in France and Belgium's Wallonia region, topping their charts.

== Background ==
The song's lyrics and music were composed by Bruno van Garsse, M. de San Antonio, Benoît Marissal, and Philippe Dhondt. The song was produced by van Garsse and Marissal, who had previously worked with the 1993 band GO Culture.

"Soirée disco" is a funny song in which the singer explains the disco party that he is organizing in his house.

== Charts performances ==
In France, "Soirée disco" debuted on the French Singles Chart at number 43, topping the chart on 16 March, during its eighth week on the chart. It stayed in the top 50 for 24 weeks. The same year, the single was certified gold by the Syndicat National de l'Édition Phonographique (SNEP) for a minimum of sales of 250,000 and was ranked at number 11 on the SNEP year-end chart.

In the Wallonia region of Belgium, the single debuted at number 26 on 16 March 1996 and reached number two three weeks later. It remained at the position for two weeks, then peaked at number one for seven consecutive weeks. Like in France, the song spent 24 weeks on the Ultratop chart. It was the fourth best-selling single that year in the region.

== Track listings ==
CD single

1. "Soirée disco" (fais le beau mix)
2. "Soirée disco" (la gentille radio mix)
3. "Soirée disco" (fais le beau mix)

CD maxi – Remixes

1. "Soirée disco" (l'étoile mix) (4:52)
2. "Boris et la fée" (6:41)
3. "Soirée disco" (la fureur mix) (5:19)

12-inch maxi – Remixes

1. "Soirée disco" (l'étoile mix) (4:52)
2. "Boris et la fée" (6:41)
3. "Soirée disco" (la fureur mix) (5:19)

12-inch maxi – Remixes

1. "Soirée disco" (top délire méga groove) (5:18)
2. "Soirée disco" (crazy mix) (5:18)
3. "Boris et la Fée" (domme mix) (6:54)
4. "La Danse des gros" (fat mix) (4:50)

12-inch maxi – Remixes

1. "Soirée disco" (fais le beau mix) (6:00)
2. "Soirée disco" (Boris l'genre de mec qui parle tout seul) (2:23)
3. "Soirée disco" (fais le beau radio mix) (3:47)
4. "Soirée disco" (top délire méga groove) (5:21)

== Personnel ==
- Music :
  - "Soirée disco" : Bruno van Garsse, M. de San Antonio, Philippe Dhondt, Benoît Marissal
  - "Boris et la Fée" : Bruno van Garsse, M. de San Antonio, Philippe Dhondt, J. Meurisse
- Mixed by Sébastien Darras and Jacky Meurisse at studios Black Out
- Produced by Bruno van Garsse and Philippe Dhondt
- Executive producer : Michel Nachtergaele for Black Out Records
- Editions : Nowdi Music / Sony Music Publishing

== Charts ==
=== Weekly charts ===
Chart (1996)	Peak position
Belgium (Ultratop 50 Wallonia)	1
Europe (Eurochart Hot 100)	10
France (SNEP)	1

=== Year-end charts ===
Chart (1996)	Position
Belgium (Ultratop 50 Wallonia)	4
Europe (Eurochart Hot 100)	35
France (SNEP)	11

== Certifications ==
Region	Certification	Certified units/sales
France (SNEP)	Gold	250,000^{*}
^{*} Sales figures based on certification alone.
