= Boris (singer) =

- Birth name: Philippe Dhondt
- Born: May 19, 1965 (age 59)
- Origin: France
- Genres: Electronic
- Occupation(s): Singer, songwriter, composer
- Years active: 1991–2004

Boris (real name : Philippe Dhondt, born on May 19, 1965, in Roubaix, France) is a French singer, songwriter, composer and radio host on Radio Galaxie (a radio in Nord-Pas-de-Calais). He participated in many dance projects and remains particularly famous for having created the character of Boris in the late 1990s, which had huge success with the top three hit singles "Soirée disco" and "Miss Camping", and for his hit "Le Dormeur", a top ten hit in France, recorded when he was member of Pleasure Game band, in 1991. He received ten Gold discs during the 1990s in Benelux.

== Discography ==
=== Albums ===
- 1996 : Boris: 18 Rêves, 18 Visions - #6 in France, Gold
- 1996 : Cyber Boris
- 1999 : Dj Xam & Boris: L'album
- 2004 : Le Carnaval des Fracassés (under the name Boris Team)

=== Singles ===
==== As Pleasure Game ====
Year	Title	Chart		Certification (FR)
Year	Title	FR	BEL (WA)	Certification (FR)
1991	"Le Dormeur"	9	—	—
1991	"Le Seigneur des ténèbres"	17	—	—
1992	"Activez les plaisirs"	—	—	—
1993	"Capitaine Flam"	16	—	—
1993	"Le petit chien qui fume"	43	—	—
1994	"Chérie je t'aime" / "Mustapha"	—	—	—

==== As Boris ====
Year	Title	Chart		Certification (FR)
Year	Title	FR	BEL (WA)	Certification (FR)
1995	"Soirée disco"	1	1	Gold
1995	"Miss Camping"	3	2	Silver
1995	"La Lettre"	37	27	—
1996	"À toute berzingue"	49	21	—
2004	"(Cette fille est une...) Poupin-up (elle a même pas d'...)"	52	—	—

==== With DJ Xam ====
Year	Title	Chart		Certification (FR)
Year	Title	FR	BEL (WA)	Certification (FR)
1999	"Ta mère elle va jumper"	26	—	—
1999	"T'es zinzin"	11	10	Silver
2000	"Arrête j'ai mal à la tête !!!"	—	—	—
2000	"Last Train to Ibiza"	—	—	—
