= Journal of Croatian Studies =

- Discipline: Croatian studies, philology
- Language: English
- Edited by: Karlo Mirth, Jerome Jareb

Publication details
- History: 1960-
- Publisher: Croatian Academy of America (United States)
- Frequency: irregular

Standard abbreviations
- ISO 4: J. Croat. Stud.

Indexing
- ISSN: 0075-4218 (print); 2475-269X (web)
- LCCN: 63-52227
- OCLC no.: 1783040

Links
- Journal homepage; Online access

The Journal of Croatian Studies is a peer-reviewed academic journal published by the Croatian Academy of America. It covers the field of Croatian studies, including the history and culture of Croats and Croatia, as well as issues pertaining to American Croats and their descendants. Established as an annual publication in 1960, the journal has published over 40 volumes on an irregular schedule.

All issues are available online from the Philosophy Documentation Center.

== See also ==
- History of Croatia
- Slavic studies
