= Gala (singer) =

Italian singer

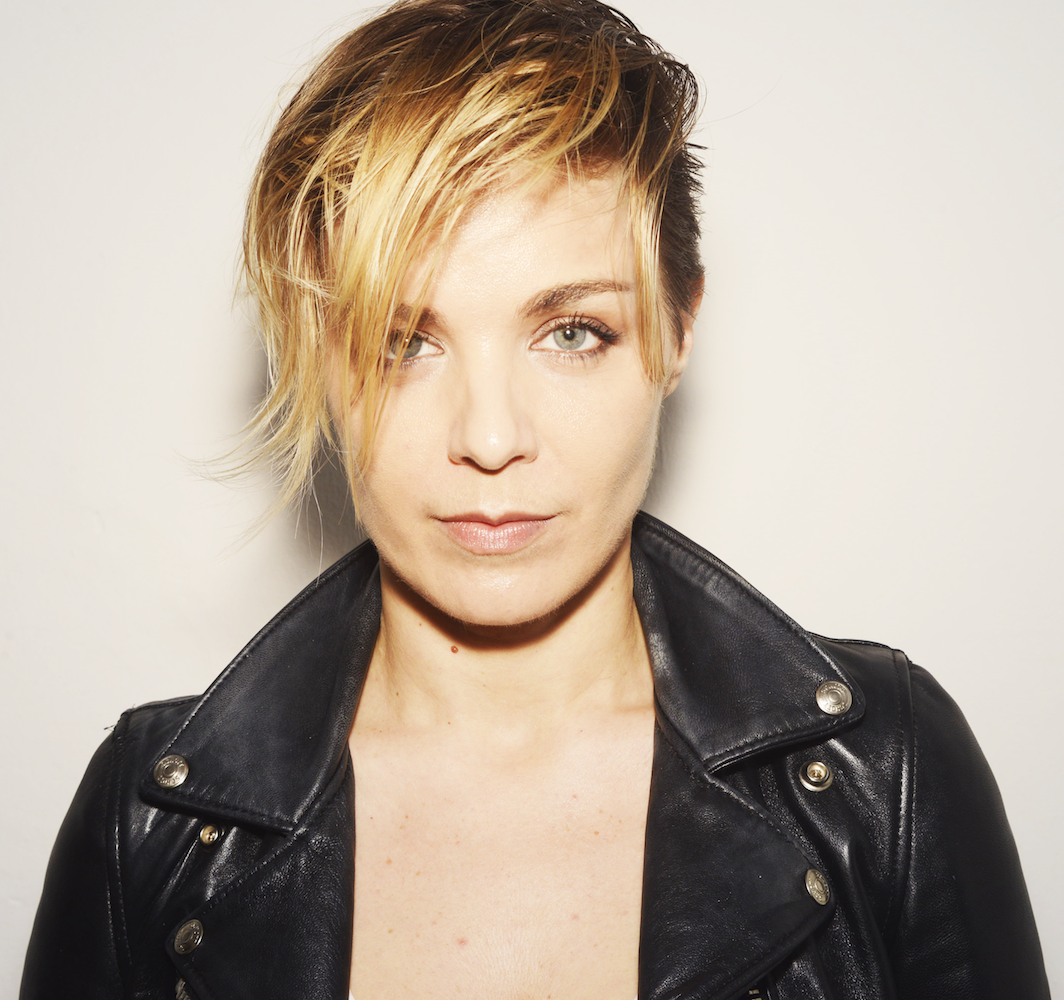
- Gala in 2014

Background information
- Born: Gala Rizzatto; 6 September 1975 (age 51); Milan, Italy
- Genres: Eurodance; house; electronica; rock
- Occupations: Singer, songwriter
- Instrument: Vocals
- Years active: 1996–present
- Labels: Matriarchy Records (2005–2014); Clipper Sound (Spain; 2012–2014); EMI (France / Middle East; 2006); Universal (1999–2002); DIY (Italy; 1996–1998)
- Website: galaofficial.com

Gala Rizzatto (Italian: [ˈɡaːla ritˈtsatto]; born 6 September 1975), known mononymously as Gala, is an Italian pop singer and songwriter. Her debut album Come into My Life included the multiplatinum singles "Freed from Desire", "Let a Boy Cry" and "Come into My Life" which reached the Top 3 in music charts across Europe, South America, Russia and the Middle East. Gala has sold over six million records worldwide.

In 2025 she was reported to be living in Brooklyn, New York, United States.

== Biography ==
=== 1996–2001: early music career ===
Prior to her music career, Gala studied in art schools in the United States, where she also recorded her first demo tape. In 1996, Gala was voted Best Female Singer of the Year in Italy by the magazine Musica e Dischi. In July 1997, she was awarded the Italian Dance Award as the best pop-dance artist of the year. Gala achieved a Diamond recording award in France, a Platinum record in Benelux and a Gold record in the United Kingdom. The same year she was nominated for the Best Dance Act at the Mobo Awards in the UK alongside The Prodigy, Chemical Brothers and Orbital. In July 1997, she won Best Foreign Artist of the Year at the Midem in Cannes, France.

Between 1995 and 1998, Gala performed on the UK's BBC Top of the Pops, France's Taratata, Les Années Tubes, M6's Hit Machine, MTV Germany, as well as performing in venues such as Bercy Stadium in Paris and Las Ventas in Madrid.

Her album Come into My Life was released on 17 November 1997, with 4 singles charting in the Top 20 across Europe, selling over 6 million records worldwide by 1998.

In 1998, while performing "Let a Boy Cry" on Taratata, she met Prince's manager Steve Fargnoli who began representing her. That same year she signed with Universal Records in Italy. After Steve Fargnoli's death from cancer in 2001, Gala broke her contract with Universal Records and returned to New York.

=== 2005–2010 ===
Settling in Brooklyn, Gala set out to redefine her sound, her life and her career, re-emerging as an independent artist.

In 2005, "Faraway" was released in France and Greece by EMI where it reached No. 1 on the iTunes chart and No. 6 in the national charts. "Faraway" was co-produced by Cash Money Records musician/producer Kevin Rudolf. It was featured in a Bod Man perfume TV advertisement, aired on MTV, HBO and was covered by Tamta in Greece.

In 2005, Gala appeared on Pink TV and on M6's Fan De. Sagi Rai made a cover from Gala's Freed From Desire for his album "Emotional Songs".

In 2006, she performed in the Mega PANN party at the Central Studios in Utrecht.

In 2008, Gala formed the label Matriarchy Records, based in Brooklyn, New York. "Tough Love" is Matriarchy Records' debut album released digitally worldwide on 6 September 2009.

Her album "Tough Love" included collaborations with a host of well known producers, including drummer Deantoni Parks, Marcus Bell and Kevin Rudolf who in 2008 achieved a No. 5 Billboard (US) hit with his song featuring Lil Wayne, "Let It Rock". Gala also collaborated with Tamir Muskat, founder of Balkan Beat Box on her song "I Am The World, The World Is Me". More recently Muskat is responsible for the Jason Derulo hit Talk Dirty, which samples the same "Balkan Beat Box" production style.

Gala independently produced four music videos for the "Tough Love" album. The video for the song "I Am The World, The World Is Me" was shot in collaboration with the Italian/Argentinean painter and writer Sebastiano Mauri, incorporating his video installation The Songs I Love To.

In 2009, she performed two nights at the Ethias Arena. In 2010, Gala performed at the Highline Ballroom in New York, at the Palais des Sports and at the Antique Theater in Arles. The same year she was invited to perform as the headliner at 24h velo de Louvain-la-Neuve, second-largest beer event in Europe, organized by the students of the Belgian University of Louvain-la-Neuve.

In 2010, "Tough Love" was featured in popular American television series The Millionaire Matchmaker (USA). The same year "Freed From Desire" was used for a Nissan television commercial in France and Spain.

=== 2011–2012 ===
In 2011, Gala performed the new single "Lose Yourself in Me" at the show Dance in the Summer in Beirut, next to Taio Cruz, T-Pain, Dev and Dash Berlin. The event was organised by MixFM Radio and "Lose Yourself in Me" reached No. 2 in the top 10 airplay charts before its release, later ranking at No. 1 in Lebanon RFX Radio for three consecutive weeks.

The worldwide release of the "Lose Yourself in Me" single occurred in May 2012 through Gala's independent label Matriarchy Records. The song has been played, among other stations, on Fun Radio and Radio FG in France. It has been on high rotation on Impact FM and Radio Antipode, and entered the new releases on Belgium's Fun Radio.

The "Lose Yourself in Me" music video was produced independently by Matriarchy Records in collaboration with The Masses. It was directed by Alistair Legrand, brother of Beach House's Victoria Legrand. The video featured full LED suits and krump dancers from Los Angeles and was choreographed by Gala.

After its release, the video was featured on the home page of Dailymotion, Yahoo France, The Huffington Post, The Mediateseur, and Vogue Italia.

=== 2013 ===
In 2013, Gala shot a video for the song "Taste of Me" choreographed by Benoit Swan, artistic director of New York's avant-garde dance company Cedar Lake, and directed by New York-based French director Alexandre Moors (Kanye West's "Runaway", Blue Caprice). Gala's video features the Alvin Ailey American Dance Theater trained Abdur-Rahim Jackson. The "Taste of Me" video appears as a one single lateral dolly shot that follows five dancers including Gala interacting in an organic dance that constantly moves forward.

Inspired by her favourite director Alfred Hitchcock, Gala wanted to shoot a video that felt like a single take. Another reference was Eadweard Muybridge and his pioneering work in photographic studies of motion and in motion-picture projection. Different choreographers among Gala's favourites (Parsons, Bob Fosse, Mark Morris) are also subtly referenced in the choreography.

The "Taste of Me" video was featured as an exclusive with Digital Spy, the most popular news and entertainment website in the UK. In Europe the video was revealed exclusively by Fun Radio Belgique, sister station to Fun Radio France, the largest group of FM radio stations claiming approximately 3.8 million listeners every day. The deluxe version of the EP includes the original production by Marcus Bell and remixes by Bimbo Jones, Hoxton Whores, Starkillers and Almighty Records. In Belgium the "Taste of Me" video was featured in major newspaper Dernier Heure (online) and Gala appeared on RTL morning and evening news to speak about her new single.

In 2013, Gala's various new songs such as "Lose Yourself in Me", "Taste of Me" and "Love Impossible" were featured on MTV networks hit television shows Best Ink, Real World Ex-Plosion, and Road Rules Extreme Challenge and "Keeping Up with the Kardashians".

"Freed From Desire" was sampled by German band Frida Gold. The song entitled "Liebe ist meine Rebellion" went to No. 4 in the German singles chart. "Freed From Desire" was also covered by Nouvelle Star "Dana", live on French television and by Greek-Swedish pop star Elena Paparizou at the MAD Video Music Awards 2013.

=== 2014 ===
Gala headlined at the 2014 Winter Olympics at Medals Plaza in Sochi. The performance was broadcast live on Europa Plus TV, the largest musical channel in Russia. She performed a one-hour set and debuted her new single, "The Beautiful". Despite the controversy surrounding the Olympics, Gala opened her performance with her 90s hit, "Let A Boy Cry", in support of her gay following. On 20 November InHouse Records label in New York released Gala's EP "The Beautiful", a collaboration with legendary House DJ/ producer Todd Terry, and a Deluxe EP followed, released on Gala's label Matriarchy Records, which includes remixes by Todd Terry, Hoxton Whores, Lodge 21, Ryan and Smitty, Midnight Magic and Lauren Flax.

=== 2015 ===
Gala made a cameo appearance at Youssou N'Dour's concert for Dakar Ne Dort Pas in Dakar, Senegal on New Year's Day. The event was televised by Tele Future Media. Through her indie label Matriarchy Records she released the album "Singles V1", a collection of her 2012–2015 singles alongside three some previously unreleased songs. The album contains remixes by Todd Terry amongst others.

=== 2016 ===
In 2016, Gala recorded an acoustic version of "Freed from Desire" at Les Studios Saint Germain in Paris, for the movie "Un homme à la hauteur" directed by Laurent Tirard with Jean Dujardin (Academy Award Winner for Best Actor 2012 in The Artist) released in May 2016.

In May 2016, a Wigan Athletic supporter uploaded on YouTube an adaptation of "Freed from Desire" titled 'Will Griggs on Fire', in recognition of the recent goal-scoring feats of Will Grigg, a Wigan Athletic and Northern Ireland player.

At UEFA Euro 2016, fans from Northern Ireland, England and Wales made their own version of the song for their players. Since then, the song has become a viral football chant.

=== 2017–present ===
Throughout 2017 and 2018, Gala headlined the 'Love the 90s' tour in Spain, with shows for over 20.000 people at the Palau De Les Arts Reina Sofia in Valencia, the Bizkaia Arena in Bilbao Palau Saint Jordi in Barcelona, the Wiziink Centre in Madrid, Parque Hermanos Castro in Gijon La Alcazaba in Badajoz and Can Fusteret in Mallorca. In that same year Gala also headlined the Gay pride party at Teatro Barcelo, as part of the WorldPride festivities in Madrid in July, and the Highway Festival in Fribourg, Switzerland in December 2017

On 30 June 2018, Gala headlined the Gay Pride concert held in the main square Plaza De España in Barcelona.

Gala wrote and composed two original songs alongside Brooklyn-based singer-songwriter Jesse Ruben and Kyle Patrick, "Happiest Day of My Life" mixed by Miles Walker and "Nameless Love" with co-production and mixing by Andros Rodrigues, for the movie Favola (Fairytale). The movie, a surrealist comedy about gender identity and liberation from social constraints in 1950s America, was written and directed by Sebastiano Mauri and featured Filippo Timi and Lucia Mascino. The costumes are the result of the collaboration with Fabio Zambernardi, the director of design of Miu Miu and Prada. Premiering at the 2018 Torino Film Festival, Favola was screened at the prestigious 45th annual Flaiano Film Festival in Pescara in June, where it won the Flaiano Award for best "Opera Prima" The movie soundtrack was released in June 2018. Gala's indie label, Matriarchy Records is releasing the original songs "Happiest Day of My Life" and " Nameless Love" as individual singles on 15 September.

Gala has performed at the last game for the qualifications for the UEFA Euro 2020 (Belgium-Cyprus) live streamed worldwide and was honored by Eden Hazard on behalf of the National Belgian Football Team, THE RED DEVILS with a national team jersey after her live performance.

In 2021, Gala released the song "Parallel Lines". The video is a collaboration with American animator, TED speaker, and free culture activist Nina Paley. Paley is the creator of the animated musical feature film Sita Sings the Blues, which has been screened in over 200 film festivals and won over 35 international awards (Berlin International Film Festival, Tribeca Film Festival, Independent Spirit Award, New York Critics pick). Her adventures in our broken copyright system led her to produce a series of animated shorts about intellectual freedom.

"Parallel Lines" explores the relationship of two lovers who are drifting apart while living under the same roof. A short documentary "Behind The Song" was released soon after shot by Francesca Pagani whose work has been published on Vice.Us. The documentary speaks about the creative process behind the songwriting and the reason why Gala felt the urge to release the song during current pandemic times. It features parts of Parallel Lines's music video, and of Nina Paley's other award-winning animations.

In March 2021, Gala was interviewed by Rolling Stone Italy and Rolling Stone Mexico. Both articles discussed her new release and featured the video of "Parallel Lines".

Gala performed "Freed from Desire" at the women's football final at the 2024 Summer Olympics in Paris. In 2025, she performed it during EXIT Festival's opening ceremony in support of student-led protests.

== Other work ==
Gala has also worked as a songwriter for classical musicians like Salvatore Licitra and Marcelo Álvarez on the album Duetto and Mario Frangoulis. She remains an avid photographer, with many of her photos appearing on her official website.

== Discography ==
=== Albums ===
Year	Album	Peak chart positions					Certifications (sales thresholds)
Year	Album	BEL (Fl)	BEL (Wa)	FRA	NLD	SWI	Certifications (sales thresholds)
1997	Come into My Life	28	16	32	20	49	SNEP: Gold
2007	Coming into A Decade	—	—	—	—	—	
2009	Tough Love EP	—	—	—	—	—	
2009	Tough Love	—	—	—	—	—	
2010	Tough Love Deluxe	—	—	—	—	—	
2015	Singles V1	—	—	—	—	—	

=== Singles ===
Year	Single	Peak chart positions										Certifications (sales thresholds)	Album
Year	Single	ITA	BEL (Fl)	BEL (Wa)	FIN	FRA	GER	NLD	SPA	SWI	UK	Certifications (sales thresholds)	Album
1996	"Everyone Has Inside"	1	—	—	—	24	—	—	1	—	—		Non-album single
1996	"Freed from Desire"	3	1	1	17	1	14	6	1	13	2	FIMI: 2× Platinum; BPI: 3× Platinum; BRMA: 2× Platinum; BVMI: Platinum; PROMUSICAE: Platinum; SNEP: Diamond	Come into My Life
1997	"Let a Boy Cry"	1	1	1	—	1	—	11	1	23	11	BRMA: Platinum; SNEP: Platinum	Come into My Life
1997	"Come into My Life"	1	6	4	11	10	—	36	1	—	38	BRMA: Platinum; SNEP: Gold	Come into My Life
1997	"Suddenly"	5	43	34	—	56	—	85	1	—	—		Come into My Life
2005	"Faraway"	—	—	—	—	71	—	—	—	—	—		Tough Love
2009	"Tough Love"	—	—	—	—	—	—	—	—	—	—		Tough Love
2012	"Lose Yourself in Me"	—	—	—	—	—	—	—	—	—	—		Singles V1
2013	"Taste of Me"	—	—	—	—	—	—	—	—	—	—		Singles V1
2014	"The Beautiful"	—	—	—	—	—	—	—	—	—	—		Singles V1
2015	"Rock Your World"	—	—	—	—	—	—	—	—	—	—		Singles V1
2015	"Love Impossible"	—	—	—	—	—	—	—	—	—	—		Singles V1
2015	"Start It Over"	—	—	—	—	—	—	—	—	—	—		Singles V1
2018	"Happiest Day of My Life"	—	—	—	—	—	—	—	—	—	—		Favola (Original Motion; Picture Soundtrack)
2018	"Nameless Love"	—	—	—	—	—	—	—	—	—	—		Favola (Original Motion; Picture Soundtrack)
2021	"Parallel Lines"	—	—	—	—	—	—	—	—	—	—		Non-album single
