= RAF Hockley Heath =

Former RAF station in Warwickshire, England

RAF Hockley Heath
- Hockley Heath, Warwickshire in England
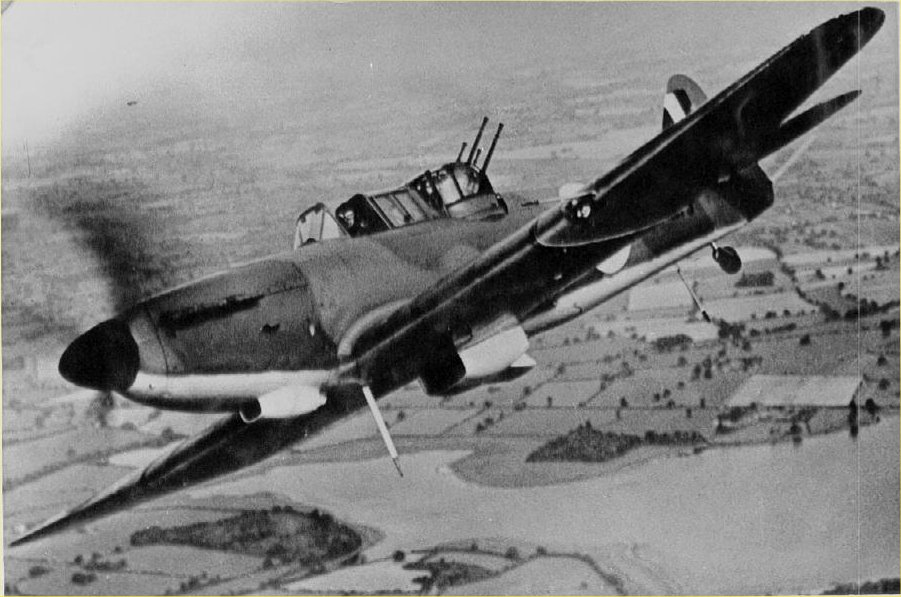
- A Boulton Paul Defiant similar to the ones that flew from the airfield

Site information
- Type: Satellite station
- Owner: Air Ministry
- Operator: Royal Air Force
- Controlled by: RAF Flying Training Command

Location
- Shown within Warwickshire RAF Hockley Heath (the United Kingdom)
- Coordinates: 52°21′39″N 001°47′22″W

Site history
- Built: 1939
- In use: 1939 – 1948
- Battles/wars: European theatre of World War II

Airfield information
- Elevation: 143 metres (469 ft) AMSL
Runways
Direction	Length and surface
16/34	800 metres (2,625 ft) Grass

RAF Hockley Heath is a former Royal Air Force station located 4 miles (6.4 km) south of Solihull, Warwickshire, England, 7.7 miles (12.4 km) north-east of Redditch, Worcestershire.

RAF Hockley Heath was opened in 1941 and was also known as Box Trees.

== Station history ==
During the Second World War a Supermarine Spitfire or a Hawker Hurricane was parked at the airfield to boost public morale. The airfield closed in 1948.

== Based units ==
A number of different units used the airfield throughout its lifetime, the first unit was No. 14 Elementary Flying Training School RAF (EFTS) which flew Tiger Moths using RAF Elmdon as the main airfield and Hockley Heath as a satellite between 10 September 1939 and 1 February 1946 providing initial assessment before pupil pilots were sent abroad in the Commonwealth Air Training Scheme which was operated by Airwork Services.

Next was No. 1 Flying Instructors School (Advanced) RAF (FIS) flying Airspeed Oxfords and Avro Tutors using RAF Church Lawford as a main airfield and RAF Warwick and Hockley Heath as satellite airfields. The school operated between 13 January 1942 and 27 October 1942 before being disbanded and turned into No. 18 (Pilots) Advanced Flying Unit RAF ((P)AFU). No. 18 ((P)AFU) flew Oxfords and Boulton Paul Defiants using RAF Church Lawford as a main base and RAF Snitterfield, RAF Warwick, RAF Southam and Hockley Heath between 27 October 1942 and 29 May 1945 which was a major unit training multi-engine pilots which were mainly returning from overseas in the Commonwealth Air Training Plan.

A number of smaller units also used the airfield like the Glider Instructors Flight from No. 5 Glider Training School RAF (GTS) using General Aircraft Hotspurs operating between 22 December 1943 and 3 February 1945 and No. 20 Flying Training School RAF (FTS) flying North American Harvards mainly located at RAF Church Lawford with the airfield being used as a satellite between 30 June 1945 and 1 July 1946.

The last unit to join the station was No. 21 Flying Training School RAF (FTS) flying Harvards mainly from RAF Snitterfield but the airfield were used as a satellite to disperse the aircraft to release the pressure and activity of the main base. The school operated between 3 April 1945 and 18 September 1946.

== Accidents and incidents ==
RAF Hockley Heath had its fair share of accidents with a number listed between 1940 and 1945. These are just a small number of examples:

Date	Incident	Reference
19 November 1940	Hawker Audax K7322 of No. 9 Flying Training School ran into the windward hedge while landing.	
11 October 1942	Avro Tutor K3461 of No. 1 Flying Instructors (Advanced) School undershot landing.	
3 March 1944	General Aircraft Hotspur BT836 of No. 5 Glider Training School crashed while landing.	
22 May 1945	de Havilland Tiger Moth T6047 of No. 14 Elementary Flying Training School hit a blister hangar on approach.	

== Current use ==
The airfield is disused and is currently open land used for farming.
