= Mr. Freeze in other media =

Adaptations of DC Comics character Mr. Freeze in media

Adaptations of Mr. Freeze in other media
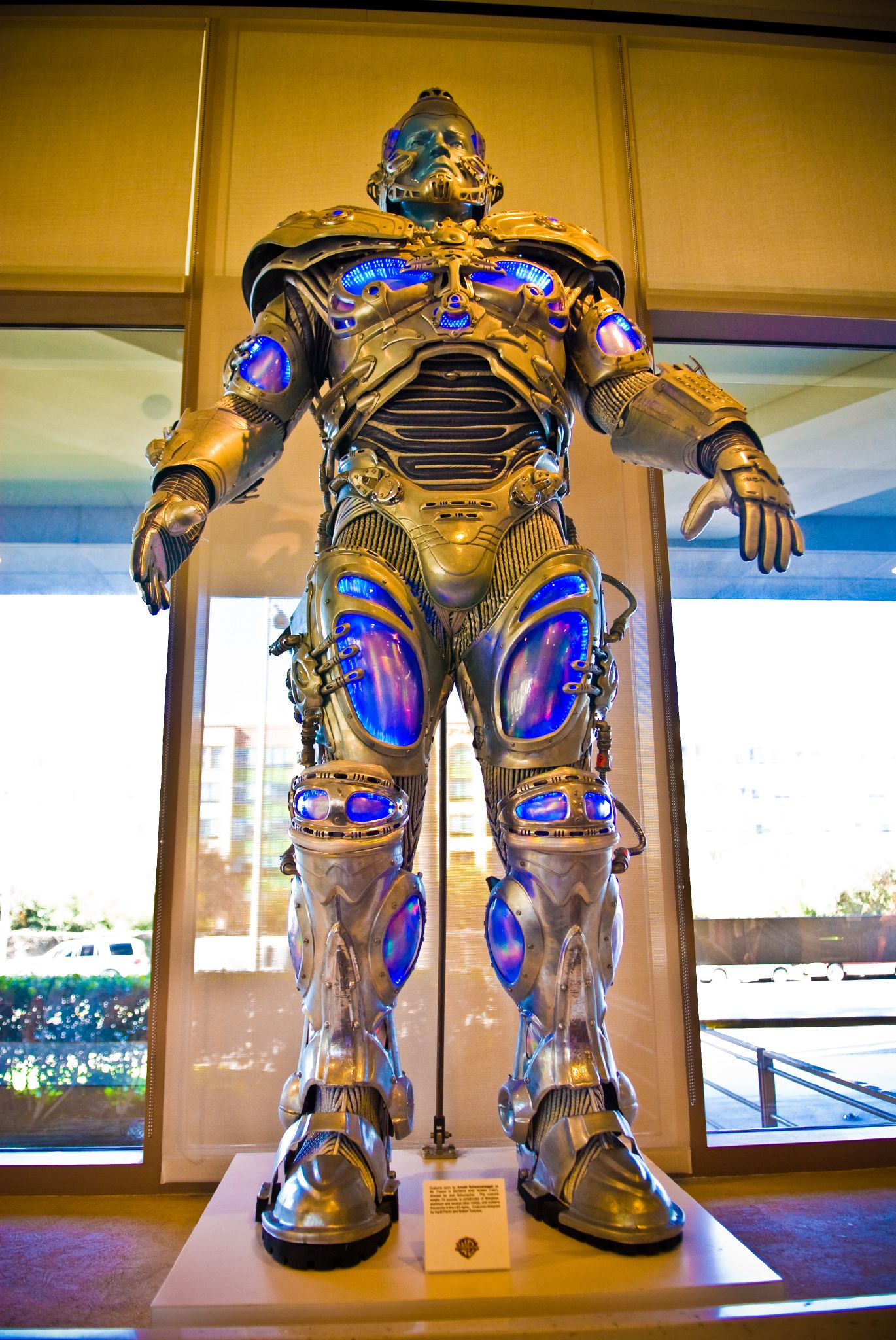
- A mannequin of the Mr. Freeze costume worn by Arnold Schwarzenegger in Batman & Robin
- Original source: Comics published by DC Comics
- First appearance: Batman #121 (February 1959)

Films and television
- Film(s): Batman & Robin (1997); Batman & Mr. Freeze: SubZero (1998); Superman/Batman: Public Enemies (2009); Justice League: Gods and Monsters (2015); Batman Unlimited: Mechs vs. Mutants (2016); Batman: Return of the Caped Crusaders (2016); The Lego Batman Movie (2017); Batman vs. Teenage Mutant Ninja Turtles (2019)
- Television show(s): Batman (1966); The Batman/Superman Hour (1968); The New Adventures of Batman (1977); Batman: The Animated Series (1992); The New Batman Adventures (1997); Batman Beyond (1999); The Batman (2004); Batman: The Brave and the Bold (2008); Young Justice (2010); Gotham (2014); Justice League Action (2016); DC Super Hero Girls (2019); Harley Quinn (2020); Batwheels (2022); Stuart Fails to Save the Universe (2026)

Mr. Freeze, a supervillain in DC Comics and an adversary of the superhero Batman, has been adapted in various forms of media, including films, television series, and video games. The character has been portrayed in film by Arnold Schwarzenegger in Batman & Robin (1997), and in television by George Sanders, Otto Preminger, and Eli Wallach in the 1966 Batman series, and Nathan Darrow in Gotham. Michael Ansara, Clancy Brown, Maurice LaMarche, and others have provided the character's voice in animation and video games.

While early adaptations of the character were primarily based on his initial depiction in the comics as the mad scientist "Mr. Zero", almost every incarnation of Mr. Freeze following his reinvention in Batman: The Animated Series in 1992 portray him as Dr. Victor Fries, a tragic villain seeking to revive his cryogenically frozen, terminally ill wife, Nora.

== Television ==
=== Live-action ===
Otto Preminger as Mr. Freeze in Batman

- An original incarnation of Mr. Freeze based on the Pre-Crisis version named Dr. Schivel appears in Batman (1966), portrayed by George Sanders in his first two-part appearance, Otto Preminger in the second, and Eli Wallach in the third. This version is an Austrian scientist who was inadvertently exposed to cryogenic chemicals during a confrontation with Batman. The name "Mr. Freeze" was created specifically for the series, and would subsequently be adopted by the character's comic book counterpart.
- Victor Fries / Mr. Freeze appears in Gotham, portrayed by Nathan Darrow. This version's surname is pronounced /fraɪs/, and is depicted as a scientist who freezes people in Gotham City as part of his experiments in attempting to cure Nora. After Nora kills herself upon learning of his actions, Victor attempts suicide with his own cryogenic chemicals but is instead rendered unable to live outside of sub-zero temperatures. Victor is then taken to Arkham Asylum and provided with a cryogenic suit by Hugo Strange, after which he turns to crime in an attempt to reverse his condition.
- Victor Fries / Mr. Freeze appears in the Stuart Fails to Save the Universe episode "Spoiler: We Couldn't Get Green Lantern", portrayed by Eric Allan Kramer.

=== Animation ===
==== DC Animated Universe ====
Mr. Freeze's designs in the DC Animated Universe: Batman: The Animated Series (left), The New Batman Adventures (center), and Batman Beyond (right)

Victor Fries / Mr. Freeze appears in the DC Animated Universe (DCAU), voiced by Michael Ansara. This version is a former GothCorp scientist who embezzled funds to cryogenically preserve his terminally ill wife, Nora, until a lab accident rendered him unable to live at average temperatures and forced to wear a sub-zero suit for survival. His alter ego and backstory were conceived by writer Paul Dini and would subsequently be integrated into the comics and other forms of media.

- Freeze first appears in Batman: The Animated Series (1992), with a design conceived by Mike Mignola at producer Bruce Timm's request. Per Back Issue! magazine, Mignola related, "I doubt I spent more than 20 minutes on that. As I recall, I had some old book on the history of DC Comics and there was an old drawing of Mr. Freeze there (that) looked very simple (could have been from the '50s or early '60s), and I just pretty much copied it. I might have done something with the goggles or eyebrows, but that's probably it." Introduced in the Emmy Award-winning episode "Heart of Ice", Freeze seeks vengeance against GothCorp CEO Ferris Boyle, but is defeated and incarcerated in Arkham Asylum by Batman, who also exposes Boyle's corruption. In the episode "Deep Freeze", Freeze is sprung from Arkham Asylum by giant robots sent by billionaire Grant Walker, who offers to revive Nora in exchange for his help in creating a frozen world. Convinced by Batman that Nora will resent him for his actions, Freeze turns on Walker and escapes with Nora.
- Freeze returns in The New Batman Adventures episode "Cold Comfort". Following the events of the film Batman & Mr. Freeze: SubZero, Nora is cured and remarries while Freeze's mutation degrades his body, leaving only his head intact. Using robotic spider-legs and a new exosuit, Freeze vows to destroy what others value most. Though his plan to freeze Gotham City with a "reverse fusion bomb" is foiled by Batman and Batgirl, Freeze escapes.
- Freeze makes his final appearance in the Batman Beyond episode "Meltdown". Having been captured by the Wayne-Powers corporation sometime prior, his disembodied head is preserved over the decades until his mind is transferred into a cloned human body by Derek Powers and Dr. Stephanie Lake. Freeze establishes a charity in Nora's name to atone for his sins until he starts to regress to his mutated condition and Lake tries to kill him. Freeze escapes and uses an advanced suit of armor he had in "cold storage" to seek revenge on her and Powers, leading to a confrontation with him and the new Batman that ends with Freeze refusing Batman's help and remaining in Powers' collapsing medical compound.

==== Other series ====
Mr. Freeze as he appears in The Batman

- The Pre-Crisis incarnation of Mr. Freeze appears in The Adventures of Batman, voiced by Ted Knight.
- The Pre-Crisis incarnation of Mr. Freeze appears in The New Adventures of Batman episode "The Deep Freeze", voiced by Lennie Weinrib.
- Victor Fries / Mr. Freeze appears in The Batman, voiced by Clancy Brown. This version is a diamond thief who is accidentally electrocuted in a cryonic laboratory chamber during a confrontation with Batman, transforming him into a cryokinetic metahuman who is forced to wear a sub-zero suit to survive. Additionally, a future version of Freeze appears in the episode "Artifacts", in which his powers have increased drastically and he has begun using a robotic exosuit as his lower body has been replaced with mechanical spider-legs.
- Mr. Freeze and Mr. Zero appear as separate characters in Batman: The Brave and the Bold, with the former voiced by John DiMaggio while the latter has no dialogue.
- Victor Fries / Mr. Freeze appears in Young Justice, voiced by Keith Szarabajka.
- Victor Fries / Mr. Freeze appears in Justice League Action, voiced by Peter Stormare.
- Victor Fries / Mr. Freeze appears in the Robot Chicken DC Comics Special, voiced by Nathan Fillion and makes a non-speaking appearance in Robot Chicken DC Comics Special 2: Villains in Paradise. This version is a member of the Legion of Doom.
- Victor Fries / Mr. Freeze appears in Teen Titans Go!. Additionally, a version of him inspired by the Night King appears in the episode "Where Exactly on the Globe is Carl Sandpedro? Part 4".
- Victor Fries / Mr. Freeze appears in the DC Super Hero Girls short "#TheLateBatsby", voiced by John de Lancie.
- Victor Fries / Mr. Freeze appears in Harley Quinn, voiced by Alfred Molina. This version is based on his New 52 incarnation and is a member of the Injustice League. After Poison Ivy succeeds in creating a cure for Nora, Freeze sacrifices himself to save her through a blood transfusion.
- Victor Fries / Mr. Freeze appears in Batwheels, voiced by Regi Davis. This version is African-American.
- The Merry Little Batman incarnation of Victor Fries / Mr. Freeze (see below) appears in Bat-Fam, voiced again by Dolph Adomian.
- Mr. Zero appears in Batman: Caped Crusader, voiced by Kevin Michael Richardson. This version is an African-American psychopath who sees himself as an artist and uses liquid nitrogen to freeze his victims and turn them into frozen sculptures. Following a fight with Batman and Carrie Kelley, Mr. Zero is shot to death by Joker.

== Film ==
=== Live-action ===
Arnold Schwarzenegger as Mr. Freeze in Batman & Robin (1997)

- Victor Fries / Mr. Freeze appears in Batman & Robin (1997), portrayed by Arnold Schwarzenegger. This version is a molecular biologist who suffered a lab accident while trying to cure his cryogenically frozen, terminally ill wife, Nora, rendering him unable to live at average temperatures and forcing him to wear a diamond-powered sub-zero suit for survival. Additionally, he displays a propensity for making ice-related puns and is assisted by ice hockey-themed henchmen. Schwarzenegger was paid a $25 million salary for the role, and his prosthetic makeup and the Mr. Freeze costume, designed by armorer Terry English, took six hours to apply each day.
  - The Batman & Robin incarnation of Mr. Freeze makes a cameo appearance in Space Jam: A New Legacy.

=== Animation ===
- The DCAU incarnation of Victor Fries / Mr. Freeze appears in Batman & Mr. Freeze: SubZero, voiced again by Michael Ansara. Following the events of Batman: The Animated Series, Freeze has made a home for himself in the Arctic with a newly adopted Inuit son, Koonak, and polar bears Notchka and Shaka. After Nora's cryonic chamber is accidentally shattered, Freeze returns to Gotham City, kidnaps Barbara Gordon, and takes her to an abandoned oil platform for an organ transplant to save Nora, with whom she shares the same rare blood type. Freeze fights Batman and Robin when they arrive to save Barbara, but a fire is started in the ensuing confrontation. As the rig falls apart, Freeze asks Batman to save Nora and Koonak before plummeting into the ocean. Freeze is saved by his bears and returns to the Arctic, where he learns that while the world believes him dead, Nora has been revived after an organ transplant funded by Wayne Enterprises, moving him to tears of joy.
- Victor Fries / Mr. Freeze makes a non-speaking appearance in Superman/Batman: Public Enemies as a member of the "Cold Warriors".
- Victor Fries / Mr. Freeze appears in DC Super Friends: The Joker's Playhouse, voiced by Eric Bauza.
- An alternate universe version of Victor Fries appears in Justice League: Gods and Monsters, voiced by Jim Meskimen. This version is a Nobel Prize-winning thermal expert and a member of Lex Luthor's "Project Fair Play", a contingency program meant to destroy the Justice League if necessary, who is killed by a Metal Man designed to frame Batman.
- Victor Fries / Mr. Freeze appears in Batman Unlimited: Mechs vs. Mutants, voiced by Oded Fehr.
- The Batman (1966) incarnation of Mr. Freeze makes a non-speaking appearance in Batman: Return of the Caped Crusaders.
- Victor Fries / Mr. Freeze makes a non-speaking appearance in The Lego Batman Movie.
- The Batman (1966) incarnation of Mr. Freeze makes a non-speaking appearance in Batman vs. Two-Face.
- Victor Fries / Mr. Freeze makes a non-speaking appearance in Scooby-Doo! & Batman: The Brave and the Bold.
- Victor Fries / Mr. Freeze appears in Batman vs. Teenage Mutant Ninja Turtles, voiced again by John DiMaggio.
- Victor Fries / Mr. Freeze makes a non-speaking appearance in Batman: Hush.
- An alternate universe version of Mr. Freeze named Grendon appears in Batman: The Doom That Came to Gotham, voiced by David Dastmalchian.
- Victor Fries / Mr. Freeze appears in Merry Little Batman, voiced by Dolph Adomian.
- Victor Fries / Mr. Freeze makes a non-speaking appearance in Batman: Knightfall.

== Video games ==
- Victor Fries / Mr. Freeze appears as a boss in Batman: The Animated Series (1993).
- Victor Fries / Mr. Freeze appears as the final boss of the Sega Genesis version of The Adventures of Batman & Robin (1995).
- Victor Fries / Mr. Freeze appears as the final boss of Batman & Robin (1998).
- Victor Fries / Mr. Freeze appears as a boss in Batman: Chaos in Gotham.
- Victor Fries / Mr. Freeze appears in Batman Vengeance, voiced again by Michael Ansara.
- Victor Fries / Mr. Freeze appears as a boss in Batman: Dark Tomorrow, voiced by Ralph Byers.
- Victor Fries / Mr. Freeze appears in Batman: Toxic Chill.
- Victor Fries / Mr. Freeze makes a non-speaking cameo appearance in Batman: Rise of Sin Tzu.
- Victor Fries / Mr. Freeze appears as a boss in DC Universe Online, voiced by Robert Kraft.
- Victor Fries / Mr. Freeze appears as a boss in Minecraft via the Batman DLC.
- Victor Fries / Mr. Freeze appears in Batman (2013), voiced by Brian Silva.
- Victor Fries / Mr. Freeze appears as a "Premier Skin" for Captain Cold in Injustice 2, voiced by Jim Pirri.
- Victor Fries / Mr. Freeze appears in Batman: The Enemy Within, voiced by Matthew Mercer. This version is a member of the Pact.
- Victor Fries / Mr. Freeze appears as a boss in Gotham Knights, voiced by Donald Chang.

=== Lego DC series ===
- Victor Fries / Mr. Freeze appears as a boss in Lego Batman: The Video Game, voiced by Ogie Banks.
- Victor Fries / Mr. Freeze appears as a boss and a playable character in Lego Batman 2: DC Super Heroes, voiced by Townsend Coleman.
- Victor Fries / Mr. Freeze, based on Arnold Schwarzenegger's portrayal, appears as a boss and playable character in Lego Batman 3: Beyond Gotham, voiced by Liam O'Brien. Additionally, Freeze's Batman Beyond design is playable via downloadable content.
- Victor Fries / Mr. Freeze appears as a playable character in Lego DC Super-Villains, voiced by Eric Bauza.
- Victor Fries / Mr. Freeze appears as a boss in Lego Batman: Legacy of the Dark Knight, voiced by Oliver Senton. His appearance is based on the Batman & Robin incarnation.

=== Batman: Arkham ===
Victor Fries / Mr. Freeze appears in the Batman: Arkham series, voiced by Maurice LaMarche.

- Mr. Freeze's cell and character bio appear in Batman: Arkham Asylum.
- Mr. Freeze appears as a boss in Batman: Arkham City. He is among the criminals imprisoned in Professor Hugo Strange's new city-sized prison "Arkham City", where he establishes a base for himself in the Gotham City Police Department (GCPD) headquarters until he is captured by the Penguin. Freeze is rescued by Batman, who seeks his help in manufacturing a cure for a fatal blood disease, but Freeze reneges on their deal to force Batman to save Nora from the Joker. While Harley Quinn steals the cure, Freeze is defeated by Batman, who ultimately returns Nora to Freeze.
- A young Mr. Freeze appears as the final boss of the Batman: Arkham Origins "Cold, Cold Heart" DLC. He forms an alliance with the Penguin to seek revenge against GothCorp CEO Ferris Boyle for causing his lab accident, though all three are defeated and apprehended by Batman.
- Mr. Freeze appears in the Batman: Arkham Knight "Season of Infamy" DLC. Freeze seeks Batman's help in rescuing Nora after she is taken by Scarecrow and the Arkham Knight's militia. Though Batman succeeds, Nora is awakened when her cryonic chamber is damaged and she refuses to go back into stasis, instead deciding to leave Gotham City to spend her final days with Freeze in peace.
- Mr. Freeze appears as a playable character in Batman: Arkham Underworld.
- Victoria Frias / Mrs. Freeze, a gender-bent alternate universe version of Mr. Freeze, appears as a downloadable playable character in Suicide Squad: Kill the Justice League, voiced by Sara Cravens. This version was forced to freeze her entire world while fighting Brainiac and joins the Suicide Squad in their mission to defeat him in exchange for their help in caring for her version of Nora.

== Miscellaneous ==
- A character inspired by Mr. Freeze named Dora Smithy appears in Gotham Girls, voiced by Jennifer Hale. She is Victor Fries' sister-in-law who blames him for her sister Nora's death and uses his equipment to seek revenge.
- The DCAU incarnation of Victor Fries / Mr. Freeze appears in Justice League Adventures #12 as a member of the Cold Warriors.
- Victor Fries / Mr. Freeze appears in DC Super Friends #16 as a member of the Ice Pack.
- Victor Fries / Mr. Freeze appears in Smallville Season 11 as a member of Intergang.
- Victor Fries / Mr. Freeze appears in the Injustice: Gods Among Us prequel comic.
