= RAF Warwick =

Former RAF station in Warwickshire, England

RAF Warwick
- Warwick, Warwickshire in England

Site information
- Type: Relief Landing Ground
- Owner: Air Ministry
- Operator: Royal Air Force
- Controlled by: RAF Flying Training Command

Location
- Shown within Warwickshire RAF Warwick (the United Kingdom)
- Coordinates: 52°15′43″N 001°36′27″W

Site history
- Built: 1940
- In use: December 1941 – February 1946
- Battles/wars: European theatre of World War II

Airfield information
- Elevation: 50 metres (164 ft) AMSL
Runways
Direction	Length and surface
02/20	1,000 metres (3,281 ft) Grass

RAF Warwick is a former Royal Air Force relief landing ground located 1.7 miles (2.7 km) south west of Warwick, Warwickshire, England. RAF Warwick was opened on a large grass field called Tournament Field in December 1941 and was closed on 4 February 1946.

== History ==
The first unit to use the station was No. 1 Flying Instructors School (FIS) operating Airspeed Oxfords and Avro Tutors which taught flying instructors. The main base was RAF Church Lawford but Warwick and RAF Hockley Heath were satellites where aircraft were dispersed. 1FIS was previously No. 2 Central Flying School RAF but changed to the current name on 13 January 1941. On 27 October 1942 1FIS was disbanded and turned into No. 18 (Pilots) Advanced Flying Unit RAF ((P)AFU).

No. 18 (P)AFU flew Oxfords and Boulton Paul Defiants mainly from RAF Church Lawford but Warwick and other stations were used as satellites. The unit operated between 27 October 1942 and 29 May 1945.

== Accidents and incidents ==
RAF Warwick had its fair share of accidents with a number listed between 1942 and 1945. These are just a small number of examples:

Date	Incident	Reference
2 January 1942	Avro Tutor K3246 of No. 2 Central Flying School RAF hit a tree during a forced landing.	
12 July 1942	Airspeed Oxford N4768 of No. 1 Flying Instructors School RAF crashed on overshoot.	
29 December 1943	Bristol Beaufighter T3366 of No. 63 Operational Training Unit RAF swung on takeoff.	
20 January 1944	Airspeed Oxford NM234 of No. 18 (Pilots) Advanced Flying Unit stalled after takeoff.	
5 April 1945	Airspeed Oxford AT728 of No. 18 (Pilots) Advanced Flying Unit suffered a collapsed undercarriage when landing.	

== Current use ==
The relief landing ground has been changed since the closure of the station with most of the hangars and all of the buildings demolished, this includes the building of Aylesford School and Sixth Form College and the creation of a business park called Tournament Fields.
