= Fresh Meat (album) =

Studio album by Arkarna
- Released: August 26, 1997
- Length: 64:58
- Label: Fume; Reprise

Arkarna chronology
Fresh Meat (1997)	The Family Album (2000)

Singles from Album
- 1. "Eat Me" Released: 1997; 2. "House on Fire" Released: 1997; 3. "So Little Time" Released: 1997; 4. "The Future's Overrated" Released: 1997

Professional ratings
Review scores
Source	Rating
NME	5/10

Fresh Meat is the debut album of the English electronic rock band Arkarna. It was released in the United States on August 26, 1997. Its moderate success was proven by two of the songs getting frequent radio air time, "House on Fire" and "Eat Me", the former of which appeared on the Batman & Robin soundtrack and the Friends episode The One with Joey's New Girlfriend. The track "So Little Time" was the theme song to the television series of the same name.

== Track listing ==
1. "House on Fire" – 5:28
2. "Eat Me" – 4:05
3. "The Future's Overrated" – 6:50
4. "So Little Time" – 5:08
5. "Block Capital" – 4:20
6. "Born Yesterday" - Part 1 – 4:07
7. "Born Yesterday" - Part 2 – 3:04
8. "Peace Of Mind" – 5:21
9. "Direct Dubit" – 4:59
10. "R. U. Ready" – 8:29
11. "House on Fire (Acoustic)" – 3:01 (bonus, hidden track)
  - The last song is a bonus hidden track after "R. U. Ready". Total time of final track is 21:33, including the ten minutes of silence between songs.

== Charts ==
Chart (1998)	Peak position
Australian Albums (ARIA)	78
