= RAF Southam =

Former RAF station in Warwickshire, England

RAF Southam
- Southam, Warwickshire in England
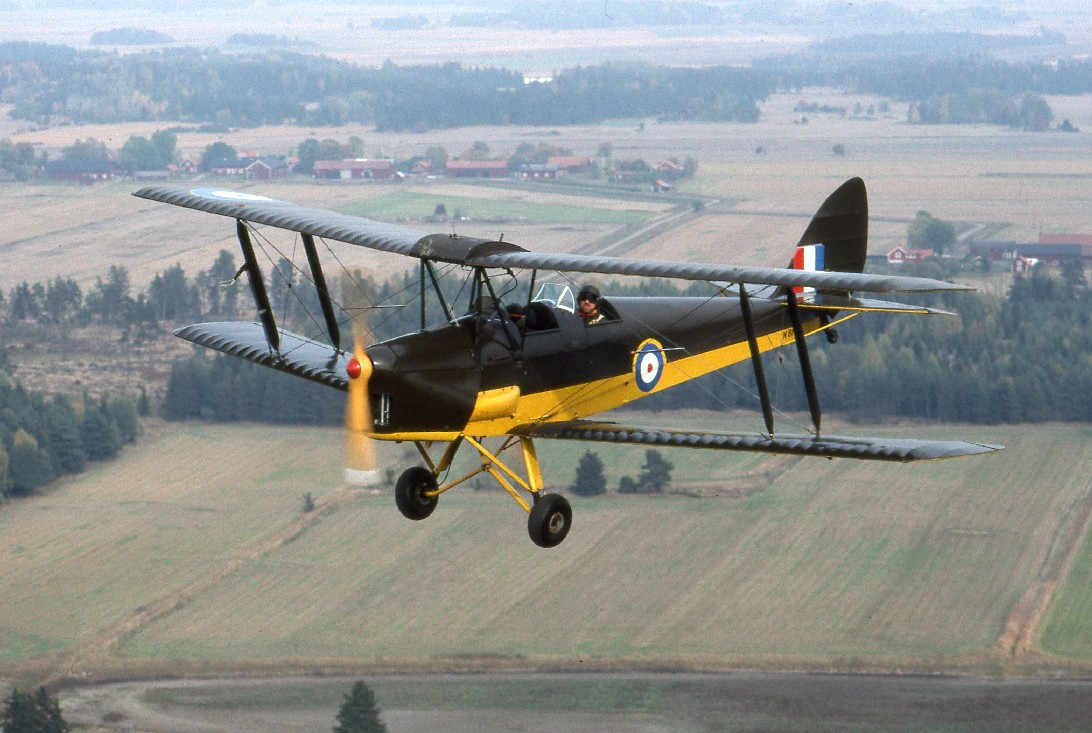
- DH-82A Tiger Moth

Site information
- Type: Relief Landing Ground
- Owner: Air Ministry
- Operator: Royal Air Force
- Controlled by: RAF Flying Training Command

Location
- Shown within Warwickshire RAF Southam (the United Kingdom)
- Coordinates: 52°15′03″N 001°22′25″W

Site history
- Built: 1940
- In use: 1940 – 1944
- Battles/wars: European theatre of World War II

Airfield information
- Elevation: 85 metres (279 ft) AMSL
Runways
Direction	Length and surface
09/27	645 metres (2,116 ft) Grass

RAF Southam is a former Royal Air Force relief landing ground (RLG) located 0.7 miles (1.1 km) east of Southam, Warwickshire, England and 7.3 miles (11.7 km) south east of Royal Leamington Spa, Warwickshire, England.

The airfield opened in 1940 and was mainly used by 9 Elementary Flying Training School training pilots. The airfield closed 18 December 1944.

== Based units ==
No. 9 Elementary Flying Training School (9 EFTS) using Tiger Moths. The School was mainly based at RAF Ansty but Southam was used as a satellite station and operated from 3 September 1939 until 31 March 1944.

No. 18 (Pilots) Advanced Flying Unit RAF (18(P)AFU) flew Airspeed Oxfords and Boulton Paul Defiants mostly from RAF Church Lawford but also from other sites including RAF Hockley Heath and Southam. The unit operated from 27 October 1942 until 29 May 1945.

== Accidents and incidents ==
Date	Incident	Reference
14 July 1941	Tiger Moth T6236 of 9 EFTS crashed after overshooting.	
31 January 1943	Auster LB346 of No. 654 Squadron RAF was blown away in a gale at Southam and damaged beyond repair.	
15 July 1943	Vickers Wellington HF812 of No. 22 Operational Training Unit RAF crash landed with a failed engine.	

== Current use ==
There is now a housing estate and Southam Town Council owned community hall on the site of the airfield, known as Flying Fields. Many of the street names are named after WW2 aircraft types and a large metal sculpture of a Wellington bomber stands at the entrance of the estate.
