= No. 18 (Pilots) Advanced Flying Unit RAF =

No. 18 (Pilots) Advanced Flying Unit
- Active: 1940-1945
- Country: United Kingdom
- Branch: Royal Air Force
- Role: Training
- Last home: RAF Church Lawford

No. 18 (Pilots) Advanced Flying Unit was formed on 27 October 1942 at RAF Church Lawford. The unit was previously 2 Central Flying School which was founded on 15 June 1941 which then turned into 1 Flying Instructors School (FIS) on 13 January 1942 and then finally No. 18 (P)AFU.

== Bases used ==
- RAF Church Lawford from 27 October 1942
- RAF Snitterfield firstly as a relief landing ground (RLG) from 7 May 1944 until 3 April 1945 then permanently until the unit disbanded on 29 May 1945.
- RAF Warwick
- RAF Southam
- RAF Hockley Heath.

== Aircraft operated ==
The majority of the flying training took place using an Airspeed Oxford, which was good, as most of the students had come from overseas training programs where they were mainly using single-engined airplanes. However Boulton Paul Defiants and Miles Magisters were also used.

== See also ==
- List of Royal Air Force aircraft squadrons
- List of RAF Regiment units
- List of Fleet Air Arm aircraft squadrons
- List of Army Air Corps aircraft units
- List of Air Training Corps squadrons
- List of Battle of Britain squadrons
- University Air Squadron
- Air Experience Flight
- Volunteer Gliding Squadron
- List of Royal Air Force units & establishments
- List of Royal Air Force schools
- List of Royal Air Force aircraft independent flights
- List of RAF squadron codes
- List of conversion units of the Royal Air Force
- United Kingdom military aircraft serial numbers
- United Kingdom aircraft test serials
- British military aircraft designation systems
- Royal Air Force roundels
