= Lazy Eye (Goo Goo Dolls song) =

1997 single by the Goo Goo Dolls

Single by Goo Goo Dolls

from the album Batman & Robin soundtrack
- Released: July 1997
- Length: 3:45
- Label: Warner Bros.
- Songwriter: John Rzeznik
- Producers: Sean Slade; Paul Q. Kolderie

Goo Goo Dolls singles chronology
"Long Way Down" (1996)	"Lazy Eye" (1997)	"Iris" (1998)

"Lazy Eye" is a song by American rock band Goo Goo Dolls, recorded for the soundtrack of the 1997 film Batman & Robin. It is the band's first studio recording to feature Mike Malinin on drums. "Lazy Eye" was only released in a promotional format. After the release of the band's next single, "Iris", "Lazy Eye" became a B-side track, as it was also recorded for a film released the following year, City of Angels (1998).

== Music video ==
A music video was released c. 1997. It features the band performing the song in a dimly lit warehouse.

== Charts ==
Chart (1997)	Peak position
Canada Top Singles (RPM)	71
Canada Rock/Alternative (RPM)	6
US Alternative Airplay (Billboard)	20
US Mainstream Rock Airplay (Billboard)	9
