= London Film Museum =

Cinema museum in London, England

Coordinates: 51.512423°N 0.121133°W

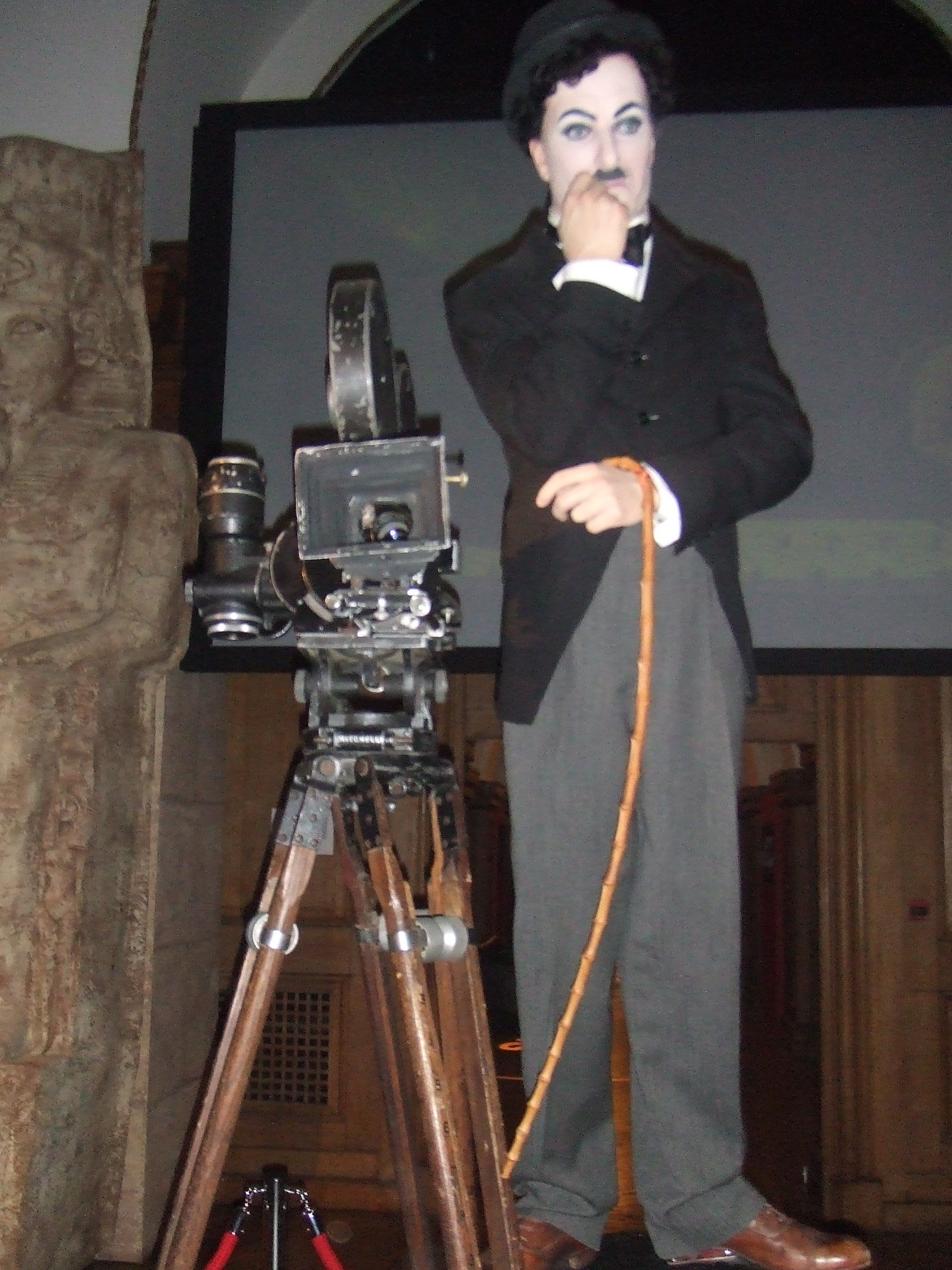
A mannequin of Charlie Chaplin as the Tramp formerly at the London Film Museum

The London Film Museum, founded and created by Jonathan Sands in February 2008, was a museum dedicated to the British film industry. It was previously known as The Movieum of London and was originally situated in County Hall, but moved to a Covent Garden location in April 2012.

It exhibits original props, costumes and sets from feature films. There was originally a section on how films are made, including information on all the major studios. Original pieces included costumes and props from British films, the autogyro 'Little Nellie' from You Only Live Twice, an original Superman meteor, the Rank Organisation gong used in their opening titles, and armour made by Terry English. There was also a corridor explaining how films are made with the chance to talk to those involved.

Two previous special exhibitions have been:

- Ray Harryhausen - Myths & Legends. This 2010 exhibition featured original creatures from Ray Harryhausen's films including Pegasus, Medusa, and Talos.
- Charlie Chaplin - The Great Londoner. This covered his early life in Lambeth, and featured Chaplin's original bowler hat and cane with storage boxes.

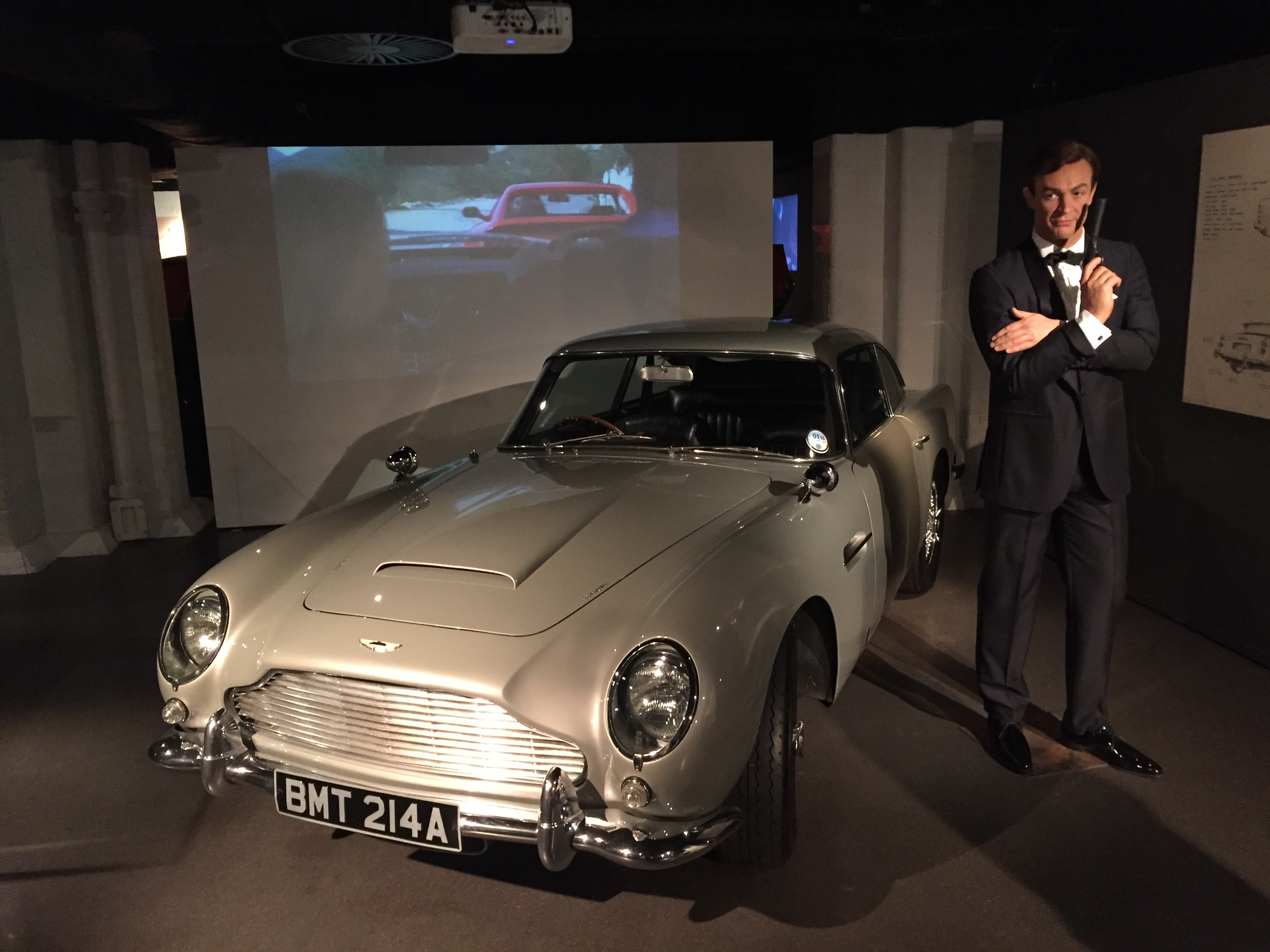
A mannequin of James Bond with an Aston Martin DB5 formerly at the London Film Museum

From March 2014, the Museum was dedicated to the Bond in Motion - The Largest Official Collection of James Bond Vehicles exhibition. This featured cars, other vehicles and original props from the film series. Bond in Motion closed during the COVID-19 pandemic in 2020. From July 2021 it was replaced by the Harry Potter Photographic Exhibition.
