= The End Is the Beginning Is the End =

1997 single by the Smashing Pumpkins

Single by the Smashing Pumpkins

from the album Batman & Robin: Music from and Inspired by the "Batman & Robin" Motion Picture
- B-side: "The Ethers Tragic"; "The Guns of Love Disastrous"
- Released: May 20, 1997
- Genre: Gothic rock; hard rock
- Length: 5:07
- Label: Warner Bros.
- Songwriter: Billy Corgan
- Producers: Nellee Hooper, Billy Corgan

The Smashing Pumpkins singles chronology
"Eye" (1997)	"The End Is the Beginning Is the End" (1997)	"Ava Adore" (1998)

Alternative Version Cover
- "The Remixes" cover

"The End Is the Beginning Is the End" is a song by the American alternative rock band the Smashing Pumpkins. Originally released as a single from the soundtrack to the film Batman & Robin (1997), it was their first release with drummer Matt Walker, who would go on to contribute percussion to several tracks of Adore and all of James Iha's Let It Come Down. The song reached the top 10 in eight countries and won the Grammy Award for Best Hard Rock Performance.

== Song ==
Frontman Billy Corgan said of the song:

At one point I found myself going, "I can't write a song about Batman, I'm in an alternative band". And I thought this is stupid, if I can write a song about Batman and it serves the purpose, which is to make it happen and connect with the movie, and connect with something that is unique and original, then, why not? For me, it was a great kind of artistic thing to do because it was very freeing. I wasn't talking about myself or trying to represent the Smashing Pumpkins. I was trying to represent Batman.

He further commented that the song's lyrics were meant to represent the Batman of the 1940s, when he was a "darker character".

Many fans saw the new sound of "The End Is the Beginning Is the End", featuring an electronic-acoustic hybrid style for the drumming and added emphasis on the distorted guitars, as a taste of the sound of the next Smashing Pumpkins album, with Corgan himself saying the sound is "probably like what you would expect from us in the future".

Despite its Grammy win and a strong promotion in conjunction with Batman & Robin, "The End Is the Beginning Is the End" has not had a strong commercial legacy in the US. While it was well received by American rock radio, the song found particularly strong chart success in other countries, reaching the top ten of both the Australian and UK Singles Charts.

Since the single and video were released under Warner Bros. Records, the band was unable to use them for future releases, leaving them notably absent from their Greatest Hits DVD and CD releases. "The End Is the Beginning Is the End", as well as the single's b-sides, were released in 2005 on the digital-only compilation Rarities and B-Sides.

== Music video ==
The music video was directed by Jonathan Dayton and Valerie Faris, with Joel Schumacher's input. It features the members of the Pumpkins in Batman-like costumes, floating in front of images from Batman & Robin. The video is notable for being only one of two Smashing Pumpkins videos to have a different drummer besides Jimmy Chamberlin (Kenny Aronoff is briefly visible during the "Perfect" video) and is the only video with Matt Walker on the drums before his departure. The video was also nominated at the MTV Video Music Award for Best Direction in a Video (Directors: Joel Schumacher, Jonathan Dayton and Valerie Faris), Best Special Effects in a Video (Special Effects: Chris Staves, Nigel Randall, Edson Williams and Brothers Strause), Best Editing in a Video (Editor: Hal Honigsberg) and Best Cinematography in a Video (Director of Photography: Declan Quinn).

The music video for this song appears on the second disc of the Batman and Robin: Special Edition DVD (also on the Batman: The Motion Picture Anthology 1989–1997 DVD boxset 8 disc version), released in October 2005.

== Other versions ==
The single contained three other versions of the song, titled as different tracks. "The Guns of Love Disastrous" is an instrumental version based around the tracks' various electronica-inspired elements, while the other instrumental, "The Ethers Tragic", is composed solely of its guitar parts. "The Beginning Is the End Is the Beginning" is a slower, less rock-oriented version with different lyrics for the verses, while the chorus is the same. This version appears on the Batman & Robin soundtrack as well.

"The Beginning Is the End Is the Beginning" was used in a trailer for the 2009 superhero film Watchmen directed by Zack Snyder. Its appearance in that trailer helped the song break into the iTunes Top 100 during the summer of 2008, and the Smashing Pumpkins added this version to their tour roster in August. The band played "The Beginning Is the End Is the Beginning" through the rest of their 2008 tour.

Prior to its inclusion in the trailer, it was "a version of that song that never seemed to get any notice", but as Corgan ultimately discovered, "[certainly] the massive jump in online sales seems to indicate it might be worth it for us and for the movie". Corgan complimented its use in the trailer, but joked that his fans "seem to be confused when the outside world appreciates our work".

== Track listing ==
All tracks are written by Billy Corgan.

No.	Title	Length
1.	"The End Is the Beginning Is the End"	5:09
2.	"The Beginning Is the End Is the Beginning"	5:04
3.	"The Ethers Tragic"	2:47
4.	"The Guns of Love Disastrous"	4:11

=== The Remixes ===
No.	Title	Length
1.	"The End Is the Beginning Is the End" (Stuck in the Middle with Fluke Vox Mix)	6:44
2.	"The End Is the Beginning Is the End" (Stuck in the Middle with Fluke Alternative Mix)	5:39
3.	"The End Is the Beginning Is the End" (Rabbit in the Moon's Melancholy & the Infinite Madness Mix)	9:28
4.	"The End Is the Beginning Is the End" (Hallucination's Gotham Ghetto Beats)	6:15
5.	"The End Is the Beginning Is the End" (Rabbit in the Moon's Infinite Radio Edit)	5:13

== Charts ==
=== Weekly charts ===
Chart (1997)	Peak position
Australia (ARIA)	10
Austria (Ö3 Austria Top 40)	40
Belgium (Ultratop 50 Flanders)	37
Canada Top Singles (RPM)	29
Canada Rock/Alternative (RPM)	1
Europe (Eurochart Hot 100)	28
Finland (Suomen virallinen lista)	7
France (SNEP)	41
Germany (GfK)	66
Iceland (Íslenski Listinn Topp 40)	3
Ireland (IRMA)	7
Italy (Musica e dischi)	15
Netherlands (Dutch Top 40 Tipparade)	7
Netherlands (Single Top 100)	74
New Zealand (Recorded Music NZ)	6
Norway (VG-lista)	5
Scottish Singles Sales (Official Charts)	9
Spain (AFYVE)	3
Sweden (Sverigetopplistan)	19
Switzerland (Schweizer Hitparade)	37
UK Singles (Official Charts)	10
UK Rock & Metal (Official Charts)	1
US Radio Songs (Billboard)	50
US Alternative Airplay (Billboard)	4
US Dance Club Songs (Billboard)	34
US Mainstream Rock (Billboard)	12

=== Year-end charts ===
Chart (1997)	Position
Australia (ARIA)	90
Canada Rock/Alternative (RPM)	14
Iceland (Íslenski Listinn Topp 40)	17
US Mainstream Rock Tracks (Billboard)	81
US Modern Rock Tracks (Billboard)	56

== Certifications ==
Region	Certification	Certified units/sales
Australia (ARIA)	Gold	35,000^{^}
^{^} Shipments figures based on certification alone.

== Release history ==
Region	Date	Format(s)	Label(s)	Ref.
Germany	May 20, 1997	Maxi-CD	Warner Bros.	
United Kingdom	June 2, 1997	CD; cassette	Warner Bros.	
Japan	July 10, 1997	CD	Warner Bros.	
Japan	November 25, 1997	Remix CD	Warner Bros.	
