= Aylesford School =

Location
- Tapping Way; Warwick, Warwickshire, CV34 6XR; England; 52°16′12″N 1°36′04″W

Information
- Type: Academy
- Motto: Wonder Aspiration Respect Discipline
- Local authority: Warwickshire
- Department for Education URN: 137770 Tables
- Ofsted: Reports
- Gender: Coeducational
- Age: 4 to 18
- Enrolment: 1,164
- Houses: Charlecote House; Ragley House; Stonleigh House
- Website: School Website

Aylesford School and Sixth Form College is a coeducational all-through school and sixth form located in Warwick, England. It was constructed on part of the land that made up RAF Warwick which closed in 1946.

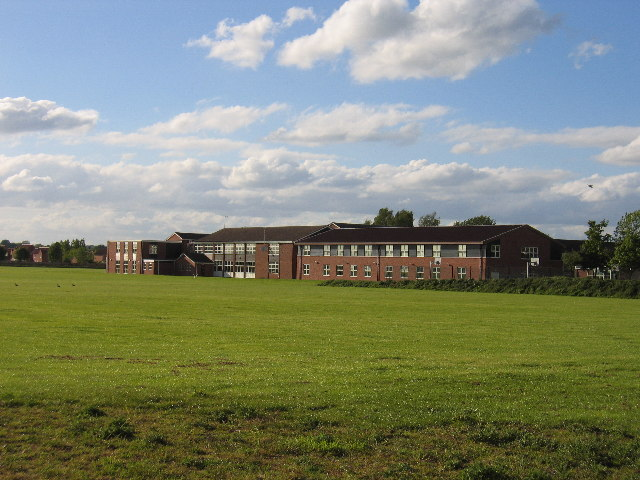
School from Stratford Road, Warwick
