= Batman & Robin (film) =

1997 superhero film by Joel Schumacher

- Theatrical release poster
- Directed by: Joel Schumacher
- Written by: Akiva Goldsman
- Based on: Characters by DC Comics; Batman by; Bob Kane; Bill Finger (Note: Bill Finger was not credited for his role in the creation of Batman until 2015.)
- Produced by: Peter MacGregor-Scott
- Starring: Arnold Schwarzenegger; George Clooney; Chris O'Donnell; Uma Thurman; Alicia Silverstone; Michael Gough; Pat Hingle; Elle Macpherson
- Cinematography: Stephen Goldblatt
- Edited by: Dennis Virkler; Mark Stevens
- Music by: Elliot Goldenthal
- Production company: Warner Bros.
- Distributed by: Warner Bros.
- Release dates: June 12, 1997 (Los Angeles); June 20, 1997 (United States)
- Running time: 125 minutes
- Country: United States
- Language: English
- Budget: $125–160 million
- Box office: $238 million

Batman & Robin is a 1997 American superhero film based on the DC Comics characters Batman and Robin. It is the fourth and final installment of Warner Bros.' original Batman film series (1989–1997) and a sequel to Batman Forever (1995). Directed by Joel Schumacher and written by Akiva Goldsman, it stars George Clooney as Bruce Wayne / Batman and Chris O'Donnell as Dick Grayson / Robin, alongside Arnold Schwarzenegger, Uma Thurman, and Alicia Silverstone. The film follows the titular characters as they oppose Mr. Freeze and Poison Ivy, while struggling to keep their partnership together.

Warner Bros. fast-tracked development for Batman & Robin following the box office success of Batman Forever; Schumacher was given a mandate to make the film more toyetic than its predecessor. Schumacher and Goldsman conceived the storyline during pre-production on A Time to Kill. After Val Kilmer decided not to reprise the role of Batman, Schumacher was interested in casting William Baldwin before Clooney won the role. Principal photography began in September 1996 and wrapped in January 1997, two weeks ahead of the shooting schedule. Batman & Robin is the only film in the initial Batman film series made without the involvement of Tim Burton in any capacity.

Batman & Robin premiered in Los Angeles on June 12, 1997, and went into general release on June 20. It grossed $238 million worldwide against a production budget of $125–160 million, and was a box office disappointment. The film received generally negative reviews from critics and is considered to be one of the worst films ever made. The film's poor reception caused Warner Bros. to cancel a planned sequel. One of the songs recorded for the film, "The End Is the Beginning Is the End" by the Smashing Pumpkins, won a Grammy Award for Best Hard Rock Performance at the 40th Annual Grammy Awards.

== Plot ==
Batman and his sidekick, Robin, encounter a new villain, Mr. Freeze, who has left a string of diamond thefts in his wake. During a confrontation at the natural history museum, Freeze steals a diamond and flees, freezing Robin to distract Batman. Later, Batman and Robin learn that Freeze was originally Dr. Victor Fries, a scientist working to develop a cure for a disease known as MacGregor's syndrome, (Note: A fictional disease that exists only in the DC Universe) hoping to heal his wife, Nora. After a lab accident, Fries was rendered unable to live at average temperatures and forced to wear a cryogenic suit powered by diamonds for survival.

At a Wayne Enterprises lab in Brazil, botanist Pamela Isley is working under Jason Woodrue, who has turned her research on plants into a super soldier serum dubbed Venom. After witnessing Woodrue use it to mutate serial killer Antonio Diego into Bane, she threatens to expose Woodrue's experiments. Woodrue attempts to kill her by overturning a shelf of various toxins; instead, Isley is mutated by the toxins into Poison Ivy, who murders Woodrue with a venom-laden kiss, destroys the lab, and escapes to Gotham City with Bane, plotting to use Wayne's money to support her research. Meanwhile, Alfred Pennyworth's niece, Barbara Wilson, makes a surprise visit and is invited by Bruce to stay at Wayne Manor until she goes back to school.

Wayne Enterprises presents a new telescope for Gotham Observatory at a press conference interrupted by Ivy. She proposes a project that could help the environment, but Bruce declines her offer, knowing it could leave the impoverished without food or heating. Batman and Robin decide to lure Freeze out using the Wayne Family diamonds and present them at a Wayne Enterprises charity event. Ivy attends the event and uses her abilities to seduce Batman and Robin. Freeze crashes the party but is defeated and incarcerated at Arkham Asylum. Ivy takes an interest in Freeze and helps him escape with Bane’s help, killing two guards with her kiss in the process. Dick discovers that Barbara has been participating in drag races to raise money for Alfred, who is dying of MacGregor's syndrome; a fact he kept from Bruce and Dick, but his niece is secretly aware of his situation and is trying to find treatment for him.

Batman, Robin, and the police arrive at Freeze's lair in response to his escape, discovering Nora preserved in a cryogenic chamber and that Freeze has developed a cure for the early stages of MacGregor's syndrome. The rogues soon secretly arrive to recover Freeze's diamonds and Nora. Wanting Freeze for herself, Ivy cuts the power to Nora's chamber, steals the diamonds, and seduces Robin and nearly kisses Robin, escalating tensions between him and Batman. At her hideout, Ivy lies to Freeze that Batman killed Nora, manipulating him to help her in her quest to repopulate Earth using her mutant plants afterward. Freeze and Bane commandeer Gotham Observatory and convert the new telescope into a giant freeze ray, while Ivy uses the Bat-Signal to contact Robin. Robin attempts to go after Ivy alone, but Batman convinces him not to fall for Ivy's seduction, giving him a pair of rubber lips to survive her deadly kiss. Barbara discovers the Batcave, where an artificial intelligence version of Alfred reveals he has made a suit for Barbara. Barbara becomes Batgirl, arriving at Ivy's lair in time to save Batman and Robin from Ivy.

Freeze begins to freeze Gotham over while Batman, Robin, and Batgirl head to Gotham Observatory together to stop him. Batman defeats Freeze in combat, while Batgirl and Robin drain Bane's Venom and thaw the city. Freeze accuses Batman of taking Nora's life, only to be shown a recording of Ivy admitting to the crime. Batman reveals that Nora survived and offers Freeze the chance to continue his research on MacGregor's syndrome in exchange for his cure. Freeze accepts and returns to Arkham, where he is imprisoned in the same cell as Ivy, whom he plans to torment. Alfred is cured, and Bruce and Dick agree to let Barbara join them in fighting crime.

== Cast ==
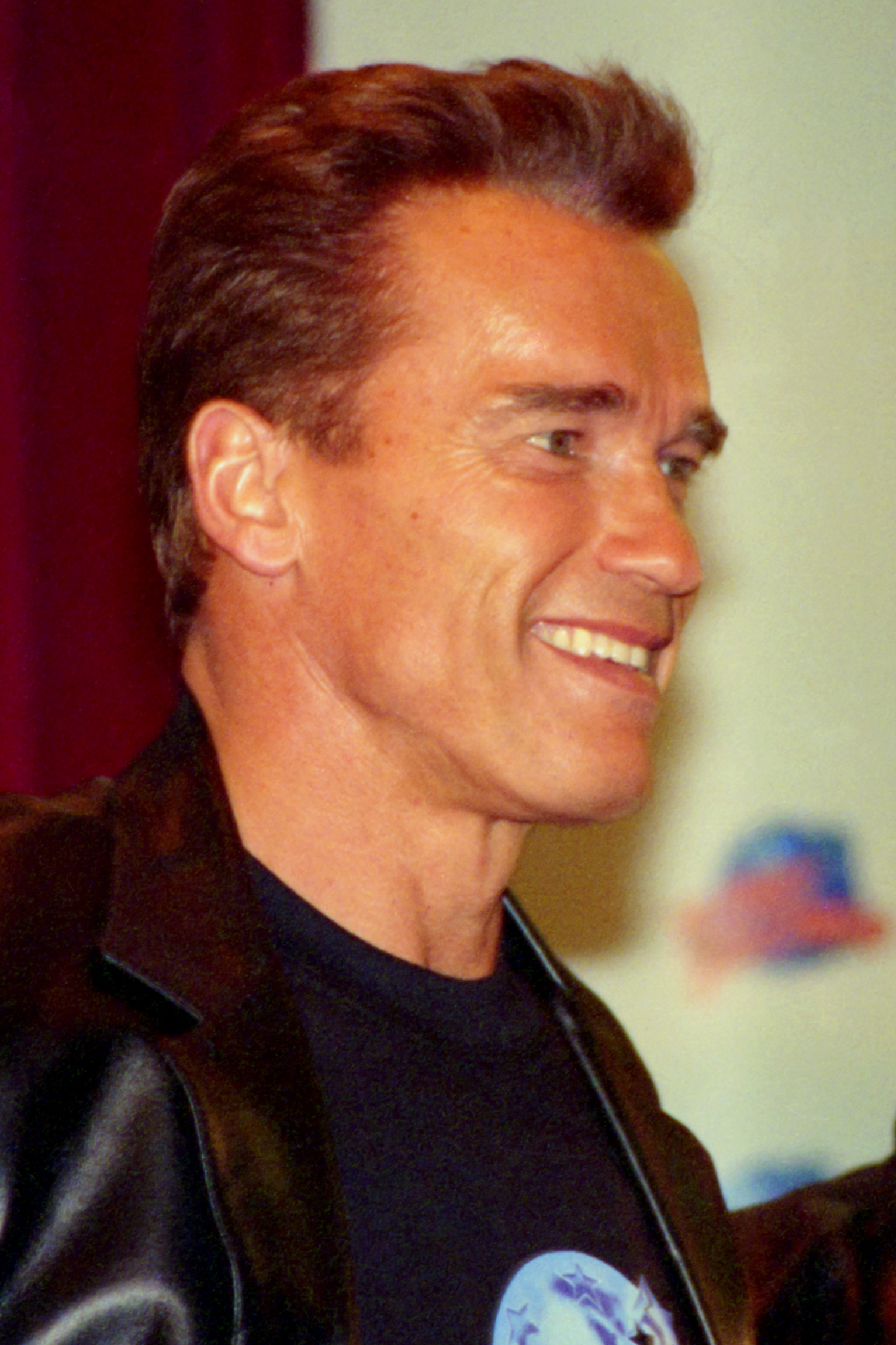
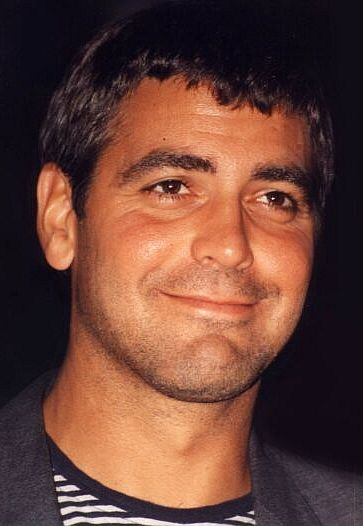
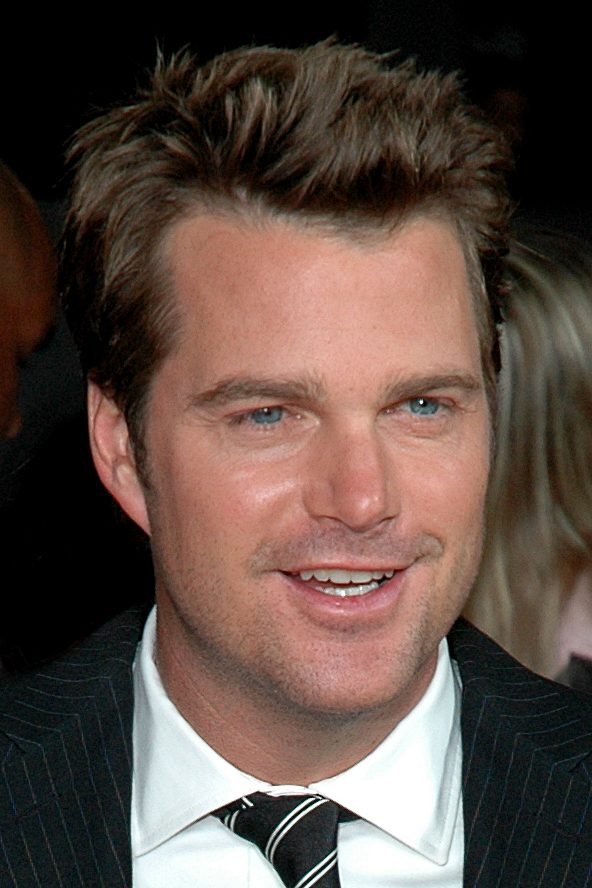
Arnold Schwarzenegger (in 1996), George Clooney (in 1995), and Chris O'Donnell (in 2008)
- Arnold Schwarzenegger as Dr. Victor Fries / Mr. Freeze:
  A molecular biologist who suffers an accident while trying to cryogenically preserve his terminally ill wife. As a result, he is forced to live in a diamond-powered sub-zero suit.
- George Clooney as Bruce Wayne / Batman:
  A billionaire businessman who fights crime as Batman, Gotham City's vigilante protector.
  - Eric Lloyd as Young Bruce Wayne.
- Chris O'Donnell as Dick Grayson / Robin:
  The crime-fighting partner to Batman and legal ward to Bruce Wayne. He has begun to chafe against Batman's authority, which is amplified even further by Poison Ivy's influence.
- Uma Thurman as Dr. Pamela Isley / Poison Ivy:
  A botanist-turned-eco-terrorist. Mutated as a result of being doused with vials of chemicals, poisons, and toxins, she uses pheromone dust to make men fall for her and venom-laced lips to kill her victims with a single kiss.
- Alicia Silverstone as Barbara Wilson / Batgirl:
  Alfred's niece who, after losing her parents, joins the superhero duo.
- Michael Gough as Alfred Pennyworth:
  The trusted butler for Bruce Wayne and Dick Grayson.
  - Jon Simmons portrays the character's younger self.
- Pat Hingle as Commissioner James Gordon:
  The police commissioner of Gotham City. He is close to Batman and informs him of numerous crimes.
- Elle Macpherson as Julie Madison:
  Bruce Wayne's girlfriend. She proposes to Bruce, but he does not respond, fearing for her safety.

John Glover plays Dr. Jason Woodrue, a deranged scientist with a desire for world domination via his Venom-powered "super soldier. Bane, a super soldier who becomes Poison Ivy's bodyguard and muscle, is portrayed by Robert Swenson in his final film role, with Michael Reid MacKay portraying the character before his mutation. Vivica A. Fox and Vendela Kirsebom play Mr. Freeze's assistant and Nora Fries, Freeze's cryogenically frozen wife, respectively. Elizabeth Sanders appears as Gossip Gerty, Gotham's top gossip columnist. Michael Paul Chan and Kimberly Scott both appear as telescope scientists. Jesse Ventura and Ralf Moeller appear as a pair of guards at Arkham Asylum. Coolio makes a cameo appearance, later stating that he was to reprise his role as Scarecrow in the cancelled sequel Batman Unchained.

== Production ==
=== Development ===
With the box office success of Batman Forever in June 1995, Warner Bros. immediately commissioned a sequel. They hired director Joel Schumacher and writer Akiva Goldsman to reprise their duties the following August and decided it was best to fast-track production for a June 1997 target release date, which was a break from the usual three-year gap between films. Schumacher wanted to pay homage to the work of the classic Batman comic books of his childhood. The storyline of Batman & Robin was conceived by Schumacher and Goldsman during pre-production on A Time to Kill (1996). Portions of Mr. Freeze's backstory were based on the Batman: The Animated Series episode "Heart of Ice", written by Paul Dini. Goldsman, however, expressed concerns about the script during pre-production discussions with Schumacher. Schumacher stated that he was given the mandate by the studio to make the film more toyetic, even when compared to Batman Forever. The studio reportedly included toy companies in pre-production meetings; Mr. Freeze's blaster was specifically designed by toy manufacturers. Batman co-creator Bob Kane acted as an official consultant and was heavily involved in the production; he gave input on the film's script as well as on set.

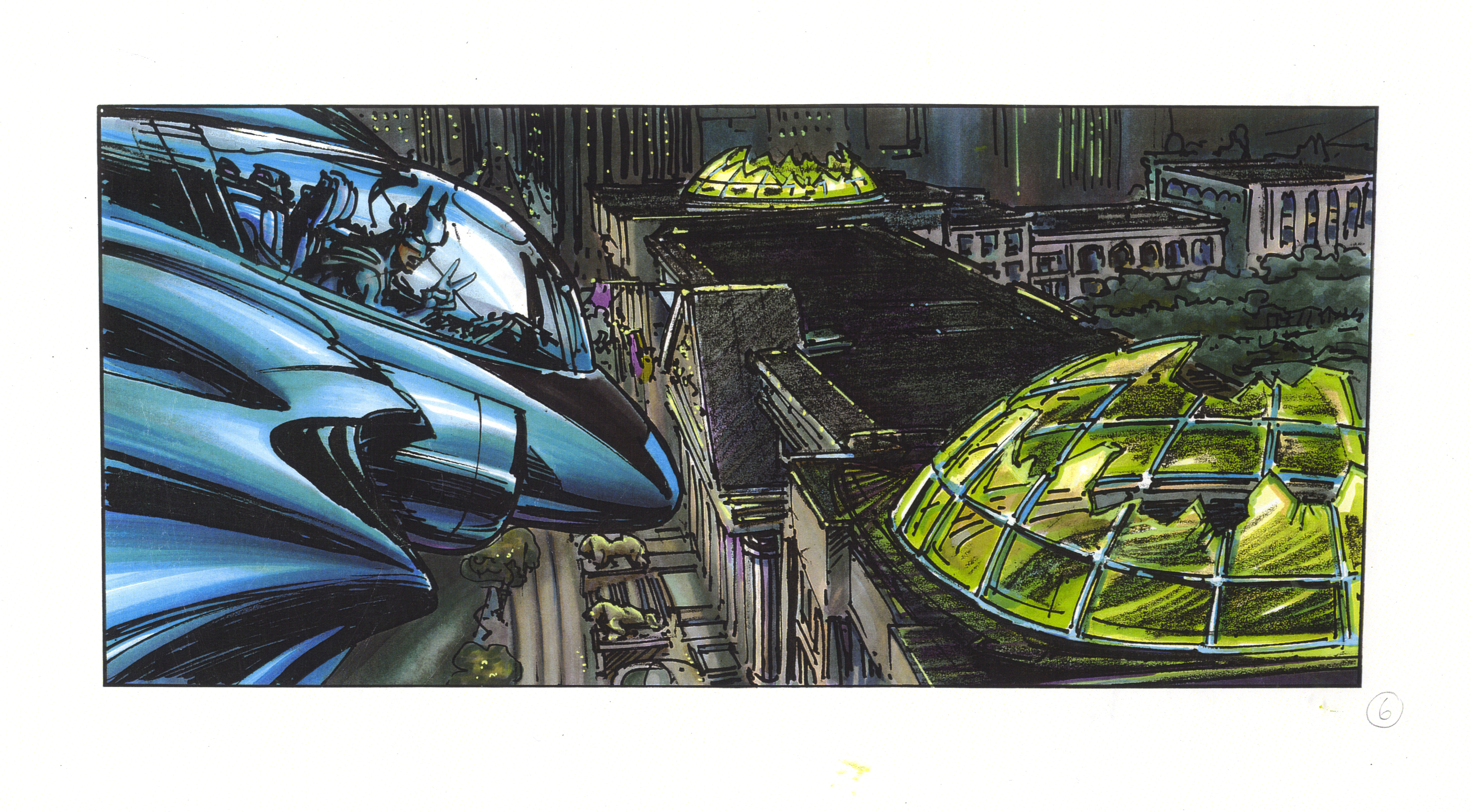

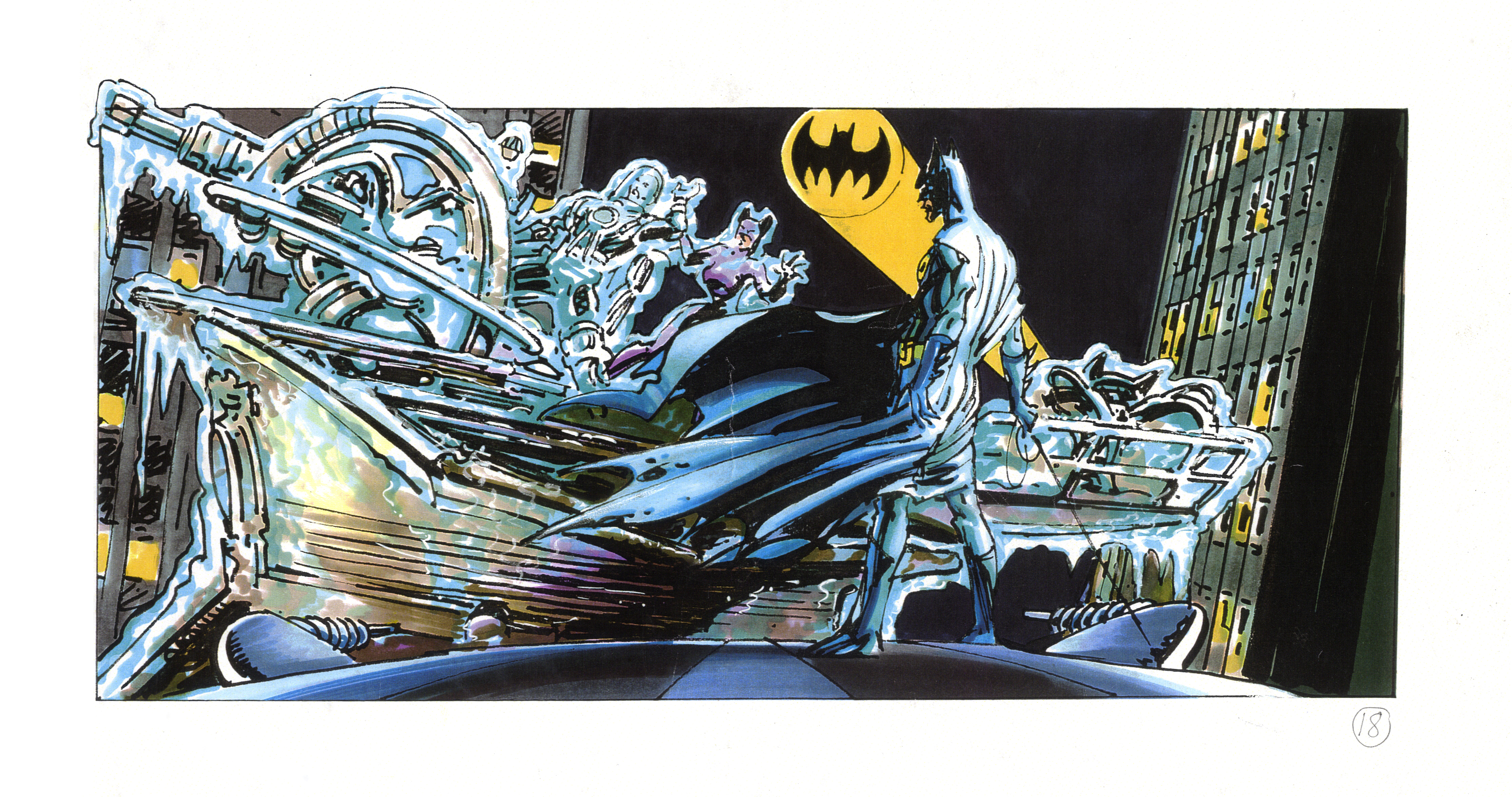
Concept art for the film.

While Chris O'Donnell reprised the role of Robin, Val Kilmer decided not to reprise the role of Batman from Batman Forever. Schumacher admitted that he had difficulty working with Kilmer on Batman Forever. "He sort of quit," Schumacher said, "and we sort of fired him." Schumacher later claimed that Kilmer wanted to work on The Island of Dr. Moreau (1996) because Marlon Brando was cast in the film. Kilmer said that he was not aware of the fast-track production and was already committed to Heat (1995) and The Saint (1997). David Duchovny stated he was considered for the role of Batman, joking that the reason why he was not chosen was because his nose was too big.

George Clooney's casting as Batman was suggested by Warner Bros. executive Bob Daly. Schumacher originally had interest in casting William Baldwin in Kilmer's place, but chose Clooney after seeing his performance in From Dusk till Dawn (1996). Schumacher felt that Clooney "brought a real humanity and humor to the piece, an accessibility that I don't think anybody else has been able to offer" and that he strongly resembled the character from the comic books. Schumacher also believed that Clooney could provide a lighter interpretation of the character than Kilmer and Michael Keaton. As a consequence of time constraints, the costume department repurposed the costume worn by Kilmer in Batman Forever for the third act of the film. Matt Damon revealed in a July 2026 interview that he had been called in to screentest for the role of Robin had negotiations with O'Donnell returning broken down.

Ed Harris, Anthony Hopkins, and reportedly Patrick Stewart were considered for the role of Mr. Freeze, before the script was rewritten to accommodate Arnold Schwarzenegger, whose casting was confirmed in March 1996. Schumacher later denied that Stewart was ever considered. He decided that Mr. Freeze had to be "big and strong like he was chiseled out of a glacier". Mr. Freeze's armor was made by armorer Terry English, who estimated that the costume cost some $1.5 million to develop and make. To prepare for the role, Schwarzenegger wore a bald cap after declining to shave his head, wore a blue LED in his mouth, and had acrylic paint applied. The blue LEDs had to be wrapped in balloons after battery acid started leaking into Schwarzenegger's mouth. His prosthetic makeup and wardrobe took six hours to apply each day. The extensive time spent on Schwarzenegger's costume significantly restricted his shooting time as his contract was limited to 12 work hours a day. Schwarzenegger was paid a $25 million salary for the role.

Beside Uma Thurman, Demi Moore, Sharon Stone, and Julia Roberts were considered for the role of Poison Ivy. Schumacher first became aware of Thurman through an earlier role as Venus in The Adventures of Baron Munchausen (1988). Thurman ultimately took the role of Poison Ivy because she liked the femme fatale characterization of the character. Alicia Silverstone was the only choice for the role of Batgirl. Before filming, she was reported to have lost at least 10 pounds for the role. Silverstone would later recount the body shaming she encountered during promotion of the film.

=== Filming and visual effects ===
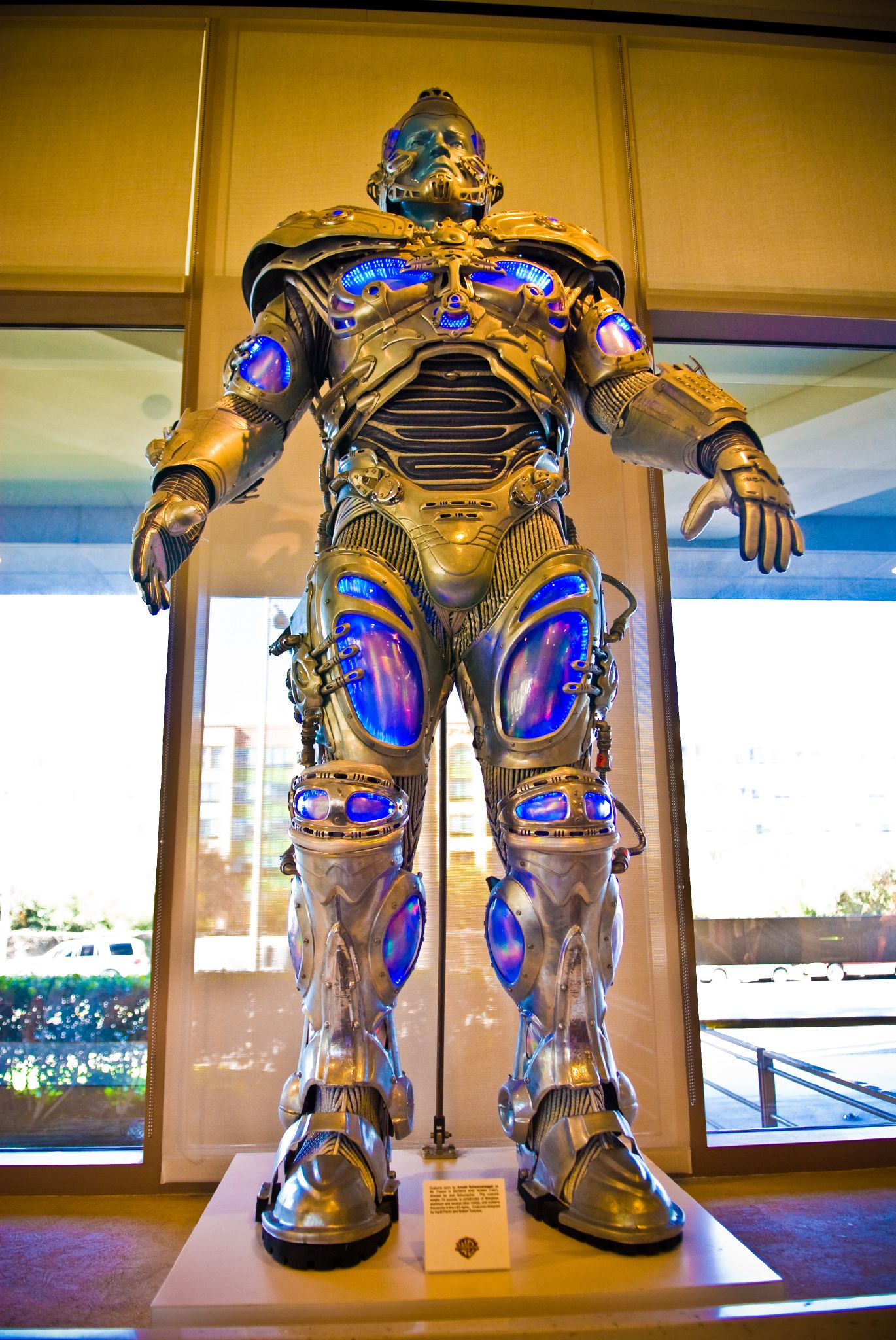
A display of Arnold Schwarzenegger's costume as Mr. Freeze.

Principal photography was set to commence in August 1996, but did not begin until September. Batman & Robin finished filming in late January 1997, two weeks ahead of the shooting schedule. The shooting schedule allowed Clooney to simultaneously work on the television series ER without any scheduling conflicts. O'Donnell said that despite spending much time with Schwarzenegger off-set and during promotion for the film, they did not work a single day together during production; this was achieved by using stand-ins when one of the actors was unavailable. Stunt coordinator Alex Field taught Silverstone to ride a motorcycle so that she could play Batgirl. Filming was temporarily halted in the fall of 1996 when Mr. Freeze's blaster prop disappeared from the film set; a police investigation was subsequently opened, culminating in the raid of a film memorabilia collector's home. High public interest in the film caused security issues on set; according to producer Peter MacGregor-Scott, paparazzi regularly disrupted the set, and photographs of Schwarzenegger taken during filming sold for $10,000.

When comparing work on Batman Forever, O'Donnell explained that "things felt much sharper and more focused, and it just felt like everything got a little softer on the second one. The first one, I felt like I was making a movie. The second one, I felt like I was making a toy commercial." He also complained about the Robin costume, saying that it was more involved and less comfortable than the one that he wore in Batman Forever, with a glued-on mask that caused sweat to pool on his face. According to John Glover, who played Dr. Jason Woodrue, "Joel [Schumacher] would sit on a crane with a megaphone and yell before each take, 'Remember, everyone, this is a cartoon'. It was hard to act because that kind of set the tone for the film." Several different stunt doubles were used for the roles of Batman, Robin, and Mr. Freeze; some specialized in ice skating, aerial gymnastics, and driving.

The film was shot at Warner Bros. Studios in Burbank, California. The grounds of Greystone Mansion were used for scenes taking place at Wayne Manor. Part of the film was also shot in Vienna, Austria, Montreal, Quebec, and Ottawa, Ontario, Canada. Production designer Barbara Ling stated that her influences for the design of Gotham City came from "neon-ridden Tokyo and the Machine Age. Gotham is like a World's fair on ecstasy." Although miniatures and computer-generated elements were used for some scenes, large full-scale sets were constructed, including Gotham City covered in ice. For scenes featuring people frozen by Mr. Freeze's ice-ray, life-sized mannequins covered in fake ice were created. Several different materials were tested for the faux ice before settling on a combination of fiber resin. According to Ling, the ice effects alone took half a year to create. Rhythm & Hues Studios (R&H) and Pacific Data Images created the visual effects sequences, with John Dykstra and Andrew Adamson credited as the visual effects supervisors. Batman & Robin featured 450 individual visual effects shots, 150 more than Batman Forever. Motion capture was used to animate digital stunt doubles; for a scene featuring skysurfing, the department recorded the motion of a skyboarder in a wind tunnel at a military base in North Carolina.

== Music ==
Elliot Goldenthal returned to score Batman & Robin after collaborating with Schumacher on Batman Forever. The soundtrack features a variety of genres by various bands and performers, showcasing alternative rock on the lead single "The End Is the Beginning Is the End" by the Smashing Pumpkins, and with the songs "Lazy Eye" by Goo Goo Dolls and R.E.M.'s "Revolution". R&B singer R. Kelly wrote "Gotham City" for the soundtrack, which was featured in the end credits and was chosen as one of the singles, reaching the top 10 in the United States and the United Kingdom. Eric Benét and Meshell Ndegeocello also contributed R&B songs. Also included was the single "Look into My Eyes" by hip-hop group Bone Thugs-n-Harmony, which reached the top 5. Other songs featured included electronic dance elements, including those by Moloko and Arkarna. The soundtrack was released on May 27, 1997, two weeks and three days ahead of the film's premiere in the United States. The orchestral score for the film has never been commercially released.

Lisa Schwarzbaum of Entertainment Weekly gave the soundtrack a "C" and called it "as incoherent as the Batman films themselves". Retrospectively, Nicole Drum of ComicBook.com described the soundtrack as a "colorful sampling of popular music at the time that feels messy, complicated, and comforting all at the same time". Filmtracks.com deemed the orchestral score an improvement over that of its predecessor Batman Forever, noting that, while borrowing several themes from the previous film, Goldenthal successfully "expands upon the statements of his title theme and action material so that they are fleshed out into more accessibly enjoyable music". Nevertheless, the website compared Goldenthal's work negatively to Danny Elfman's scores for Batman (1989) and Batman Returns (1992). In an interview with IGN, composer Hans Zimmer, who contributed the scores to Christopher Nolan's Dark Knight trilogy, called Goldenthal's theme "the most glorious statement of Batman I'd ever heard". "The End Is the Beginning Is the End" won a Grammy Award for Best Hard Rock Performance at the 40th Annual Grammy Awards.

== Release ==
Batman & Robin had its premiere on June 12, 1997, in Westwood, Los Angeles. The film marked the United Kingdom's then-"biggest and most expensive" movie premiere. The event was held at Battersea Power Station in London, with the building decorated to look like Gotham City and Wayne Manor. Expected to be among the tent poles of the summer movie season, the film opened in the United States on June 20, 1997, in 2,934 theaters, where it remained for an average of approximately 6.2 weeks. The film was released on VHS and DVD four months later on October 21, 1997 by Warner Home Video. In the home video market, it became the top-selling video in the United States in November 1997. A special edition DVD was released in 2005 that included a documentary series about the production of the film series, Shadows of the Bat: The Cinematic Saga of the Dark Knight.

=== Marketing ===
The theatrical trailer for Batman & Robin debuted on the February 19, 1997, episode of Entertainment Tonight. Warner Bros. spent $125 million to market and promote the film, in addition to its $160 million production budget. Several Six Flags amusement parks introduced new roller coasters themed to the film. Batman & Robin: The Chiller opened at Six Flags Great Adventure in 1997, and a Mr. Freeze-themed roller coaster opened at both Six Flags Over Texas and Six Flags St. Louis in 1998. Taco Bell launched a $20 million promotional campaign for the film, selling Batman-themed cups, collector toys, and figurines. Themed trading cards produced by Fleer and SkyBox International were also sold, some signed by Clooney, Schwarzenegger, Thurman, Silverstone, O'Donnell, and Schumacher. A tie-in video game developed by Probe Entertainment was released for the PlayStation on August 5, 1998, to mixed reviews.

== Reception ==
=== Box office ===
Batman & Robin was released on June 20, 1997, in the United States and Canada, grossing $42,872,605 in its opening weekend. That made it the third-highest opening weekend gross of 1997, behind Men in Black and The Lost World: Jurassic Park, and the seventh-highest non-holiday opening weekend of all time as of its release. The film would hold the record for having the highest opening weekend for a Schwarzenegger film until 2003 when it was surpassed by Terminator 3: Rise of the Machines. Its opening weekend gross also remained Clooney's highest until the release of Gravity in 2013. It reached the number one spot at the box office during its opening weekend, beating out My Best Friend's Wedding and Speed 2: Cruise Control. This would become Schwarzenegger's most recent film to achieve this feat for five years until Collateral Damage opened in 2002. Batman & Robin declined by 63% in its second weekend, which was credited to poor word of mouth and early competition with Face/Off, Hercules, and Men in Black. In the UK, it had the second-highest opening ever behind Independence Day with a gross of £4,940,566 ($8.2 million) for the weekend.

The film grossed $107.4 million in the United States and Canada and $130.9 million internationally, coming to a worldwide total of $238.3 million. It grossed substantially less than the previous film in the series, and finished outside of the top ten films of 1997. With a production budget of $125–160 million, the film was considered to have under-performed at the box-office, although it was estimated to have at least broken even. Schumacher criticized "prejudicial prerelease buzz" online and false news reports as a cause for the film's poor commercial performance. Warner Bros. acknowledged Batman & Robin's shortcomings in the domestic market but pointed out its success in other markets. In his book Batman: the Complete History, Les Daniels analyzed the film's relatively strong performance outside of the United States, speculating that "nuances of languages or personality were likely to be lost in translation and admittedly eye-popping spectacle seemed sufficient."

=== Critical response ===
On the review aggregator website Rotten Tomatoes, 11% of 95 critics' reviews are positive, with an average rating of 3.8/10. The website's consensus reads: "Joel Schumacher's tongue-in-cheek attitude hits an unbearable limit in Batman & Robin, resulting in a frantic and mindless movie that's too jokey to care much for." Metacritic, which uses a weighted average, assigned the film a score of 29 out of 100, based on 21 critics, indicating "generally unfavorable" reviews. Audiences polled by CinemaScore gave the film an average grade of "C+" on an A+ to F scale.

Jay Boyar of Orlando Sentinel believed Batman & Robin to be the least distinctive chapter in the series, calling it a "bat-smorgasbord of action, camp, pathos, spectacle and whatever" and blaming its blandness on the studio's increased involvement in its production. In his "thumbs down" review, Roger Ebert of the Chicago Sun-Times found the film to be "wonderful to look at" although it had "nothing authentic at its core", criticizing its toyetic approach. Writing for the Chicago Tribune, Gene Siskel, who gave positive reviews to the previous Batman films, also gave Batman & Robin a "thumbs down" rating, calling it a "sniggering, exhausting, overproduced extravaganza". While commending the film's visuals, Kenneth Turan of the Los Angeles Times called the film "indifferently acted" and "far too slick for even a toehold's worth of connection", believing that it "killed" the Batman film series. Desson Howe of The Washington Post disapproved of Schumacher's direction and Akiva Goldsman's script, calling it an "emptily flashy, meandering fashion show of a summer flick" and also believing that it should mark the end to the series. Andrew Johnston, writing in Time Out, remarked, "It's hard to tell who B&R is intended for. Anyone who knows the character from the comics or the superb animated show on Fox will be alienated. And though Schumacher treats the Adam West version as gospel, that show's campy humor is completely incompatible with these production values." James Berardinelli questioned the "random amount of rubber nipples and camera angle close-ups of the Dynamic Duo's butts and Bat-crotches". In a negative review, Peter Rainer of Dallas Observer explained that "the fourth installment in the Batman franchise is one long head-splitting exercise in clueless cacophony that makes you feel as though you're being held hostage in some haywire Planet Hollywood while sonic booms pummel your auditory canal".

In his review for the San Francisco Chronicle, Mick LaSalle said that the film failed to "convincingly inhabit the grandeur of its art direction and special effects", criticizing Clooney as "the big zero of the film", who "should go down in history as the George Lazenby of the series". While deeming Clooney "the most ideal Batman to date" in a physical sense, Todd McCarthy of Variety found the character uninteresting and Clooney "unable to compensate onscreen for the lack of dimension on paper". Conversely, he described Thurman and Schwarzenegger's performances as the villainous duo as the "highlights of the film", pointing out Thurman's "comic wit conspicuously lacking elsewhere in the picture". Writing for Star Tribune, Jeff Strickler criticized its "almost embarrassingly mundane" dialogue and called Schwarzenegger "wasted" in the role of Mr. Freeze and his character "drably written". Janet Maslin of The New York Times gave a more positive review and praised Thurman's performance as "perfect", comparing it to Mae West's "[mix of] true femininity with the winking womanliness of a drag queen", but criticizing Silverstone and Clooney's performances. Steven Rea of The Philadelphia Inquirer found Thurman at times "amusing" and similarly described her performance as "Mae West with moss".

=== Legacy ===
Batman & Robin is considered to be one of the worst superhero films and among the worst films ever made. In an interview with Vice 20 years after its release, Schumacher apologized for the film while taking full responsibility for its poor reputation, stating, "I want to apologize to every fan that was disappointed because I think I owe them that. A lot of it was my choice. No one is responsible for my mistakes but me." He added, "I was scum. It was like I had murdered a baby", recounting his initial reaction to the overwhelmingly negative public response. Goldsman also apologized, saying, "we didn't mean for it to be bad. I swear, nobody was like, 'This will be bad'", and elaborating that the film was initially intended to be darker in tone.

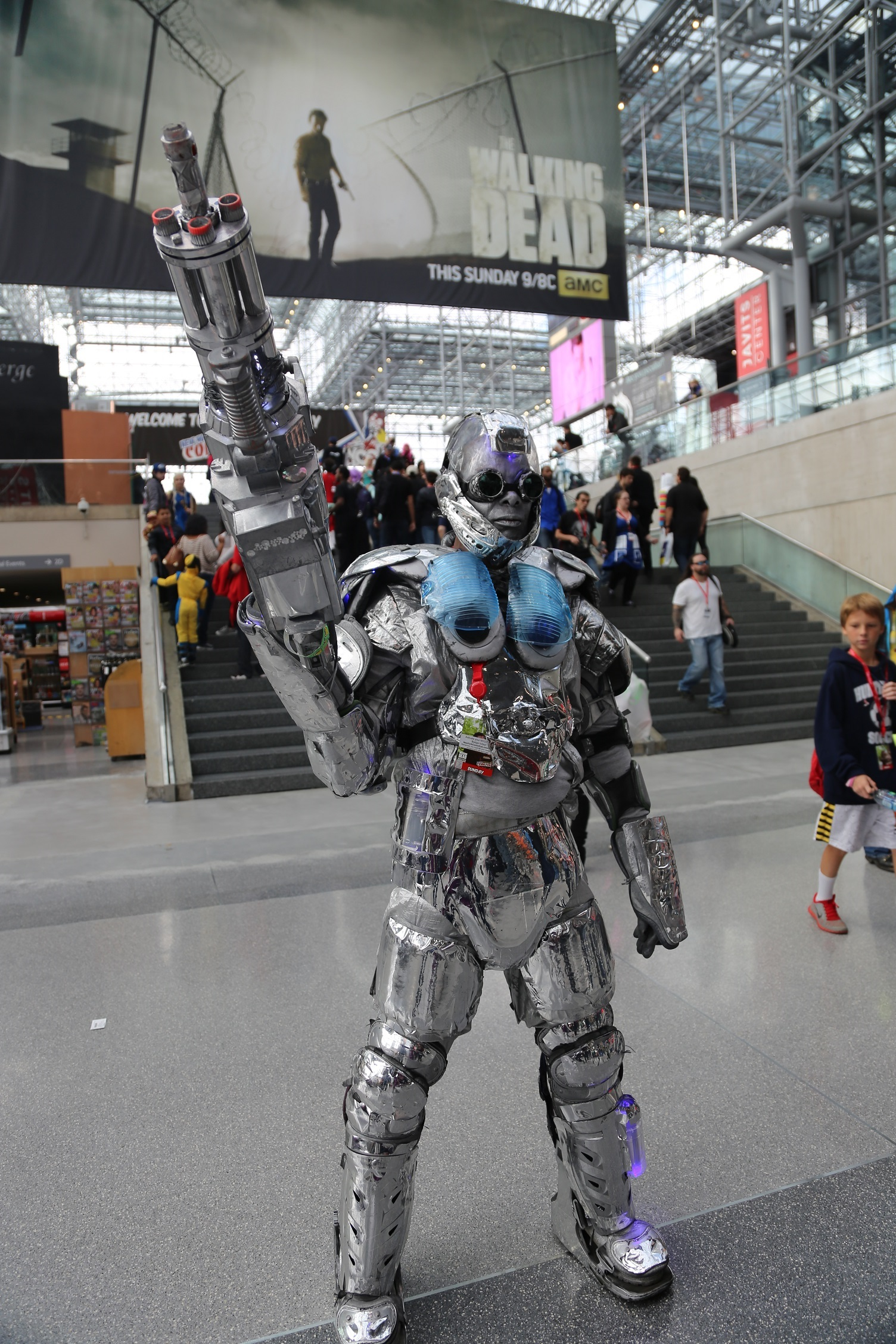
A person cosplaying as the film's depiction of Mr. Freeze.

Retrospectively, Clooney has spoken critically of and apologized for his involvement in the film, saying in 2005, "I think we might have killed the franchise", and calling it "a waste of money". In 2015, while promoting Disney's Tomorrowland at New York Comic Con, Clooney said that he had met former Batman actor Adam West and apologized to him for the film. Furthermore, when asked during a 2015 interview on The Graham Norton Show about whether he had ever had to apologize for Batman & Robin, Clooney responded, "I always apologize for Batman & Robin". In late 2020, he told Howard Stern that it was "physically" painful to watch his work in the role: "The truth of the matter is, I was bad in it. Akiva Goldsman — who's won the Oscar for writing since then — wrote the screenplay. And it's a terrible screenplay, he'll tell you. I'm terrible at it, I'll tell you. Joel Schumacher, who just passed away, directed it, and he'd say, 'Yeah, it didn't work.' We all whiffed on that one." In 2021, Clooney said he refuses to let his wife Amal watch the film. In 2023, Clooney was asked about what his biggest regret, he responded "I regret doing fucking Batman".

Conversely, in an interview with Empire in 2012, Schwarzenegger stated that, despite its poor reception, he did not regret making the film, commenting about his role as Mr. Freeze and his involvement with the studio, "I felt that the character was interesting and two movies before that one Joel Schumacher was at his height. So the decision-making process was not off. At the same time, I was doing Eraser (1996) over there and Warner Bros. begged me to do the movie." Similarly, 25 years after its theatrical release, Thurman described her work on the film as a "fantastic experience".

In 2009, Marvel Studios president Kevin Feige said that Batman & Robin may be the most important comic book film ever made in that it was "so bad that it demanded a new way of doing things" and created the opportunity to make X-Men (2000) and Spider-Man (2002) in a way that respected the source material to a higher degree.

The nipples seen on the character's costumes, first appearing in Batman Forever and accentuated for Batman & Robin at Schumacher's request, remain among the most defining aspects of the film. Recounting his involvement with the film, costume designer Jose Fernandez stated that he was opposed to "sharpening" the nipples, calling them "ridiculous". In 2022, Tim Burton commented about Warner Bros.' decision to replace him as director with Schumacher after Batman Returns, "You complain about me, I'm too weird, I'm too dark, and then you put nipples on the costume? Go fuck yourself." Clooney's screen-worn suit was put up for auction by Heritage Auctions in 2022 with a starting bid of $40,000. A previous owner had estimated it to be worth $100,000 in 2006 when Clooney was considered to be at the height of his career. The suit sold for $57,500.

In the 2009 film Watchmen, director Zack Snyder and comic book artist Dave Gibbons referenced the molded muscle and nipple Batsuit design from Batman & Robin for the Ozymandias costume. The film is referenced in the Batman: The Brave and the Bold episode "Legends of the Dark Mite!", when Bat-Mite briefly uses his powers to transform Batman's costume into the same suit shown in Schumacher's Batman films, before declaring it "too icky".

Twenty-six years after the release of Batman & Robin, Clooney made a cameo appearance as Bruce Wayne in the 2023 DC Extended Universe superhero film The Flash. Clooney was asked to reprise the role when the film was already in post-production, agreeing to join after seeing a cut of the film; filming took place in secret six months before release and lasted half a day.

=== Accolades ===
Date	Award	Category	Recipients	Result	Ref.
1998	Dallas–Fort Worth Film Critics Association Awards	Worst Film	Batman & Robin (Warner Bros.)	Won	
1998	Stinkers Bad Movie Awards	Worst Picture	Batman & Robin (Warner Bros.)	Won	
1998	Stinkers Bad Movie Awards	Worst Director	Joel Schumacher	Won	
1998	Stinkers Bad Movie Awards	Worst Supporting Actress	Alicia Silverstone	Won	
1998	Stinkers Bad Movie Awards	Worst Sequel	Batman & Robin (Warner Bros.)	Nominated	
1998	Stinkers Bad Movie Awards	Worst Screenplay for a Film Grossing Over $100M Worldwide Using Hollywood Math	Akiva Goldsman	Won	
March 22, 1998	Golden Raspberry Awards	Worst Picture	Batman & Robin (Warner Bros.)	Nominated	
March 22, 1998	Golden Raspberry Awards	Worst Supporting Actor	Chris O'Donnell	Nominated	
March 22, 1998	Golden Raspberry Awards	Worst Supporting Actor	Arnold Schwarzenegger	Nominated	
March 22, 1998	Golden Raspberry Awards	Worst Supporting Actress	Alicia Silverstone	Won	
March 22, 1998	Golden Raspberry Awards	Worst Supporting Actress	Uma Thurman	Nominated	
March 22, 1998	Golden Raspberry Awards	Worst Screen Couple	George Clooney and Chris O'Donnell	Nominated	
March 22, 1998	Golden Raspberry Awards	Worst Remake or Sequel	Batman & Robin (Warner Bros.)	Nominated	
March 22, 1998	Golden Raspberry Awards	Worst Director	Joel Schumacher	Nominated	
March 22, 1998	Golden Raspberry Awards	Worst Screenplay	Akiva Goldsman	Nominated	
March 22, 1998	Golden Raspberry Awards	Worst Original Song	"The End Is the Beginning Is the End" by Billy Corgan	Nominated	
March 22, 1998	Golden Raspberry Awards	Worst Reckless Disregard for Human Life and Public Property	Batman & Robin (Warner Bros.)	Nominated	
April 4, 1998	Kids' Choice Awards	Favorite Movie	Batman & Robin (Warner Bros.)	Nominated	
April 4, 1998	Kids' Choice Awards	Favorite Movie Actress	Alicia Silverstone	Won	
April 4, 1998	Kids' Choice Awards	Favorite Movie Actress	Uma Thurman	Nominated	

== Canceled sequel ==
During the filming of Batman & Robin, Warner Bros. was impressed with the dailies, prompting them to immediately hire Schumacher to return as director for a fifth film. However, Goldsman turned down an offer to write the script. In late 1996, Warner Bros. and Schumacher hired Mark Protosevich to write the script for a fifth Batman film. A projected mid-1999 release date was announced. Los Angeles Times described their film as "continuing in the same vein with multiple villains and more silliness". Titled Batman Unchained, Protosevich's script featured the Scarecrow as the main villain, who, through the use of his fear toxin, resurrects the Joker as a hallucination in Batman's mind. Harley Quinn would appear as a supporting character, written as the Joker's daughter. Schumacher approached Nicolas Cage to portray the Scarecrow while he was filming Face/Off (1997) and Courtney Love was considered for Harley Quinn. Schumacher said he begged the studio for him to do The Dark Knight Returns (1986) story for the "fifth film", but they wanted to keep the "family-friendly, toyetic thing".

Clooney, O'Donnell, Silverstone, and Coolio were set to reprise the roles of Batman, Robin, Batgirl, and Scarecrow. It was hoped that the villains from previous films would make cameo appearances in the hallucinations caused by Scarecrow, culminating with Jack Nicholson reprising the role of the Joker. Following the poor critical and financial reception of Batman & Robin, Clooney vowed never to reprise his role, and Warner Bros. cancelled any future Batman films, including Schumacher's planned Batman Unchained. In a 2012 interview with Access Hollywood, O'Donnell claimed that a spin-off centered around Robin was planned, but eventually scrapped due to Batman & Robin's poor commercial performance.

== See also ==
- Homosexuality in the Batman franchise
- List of films featuring powered exoskeletons
- List of films considered the worst
