= Arkarna =

Electronic music group

- Origin: London, England
- Genres: Electronica, alternative rock, electronic rock, house, big beat
- Years active: 1994–present
- Members: Ollie Jacobs (lead vocals, keyboards); Matt Hart (guitar)
- Past members: James Barnett; Lalo Creme; Sebastian Beresford
- Website: http://arkarna.net/

Arkarna is an English electronic/rock band, comprising singer-songwriter/programmer Ollie Jacobs and guitarist Matt Hart. Past members included James Barnett, guitarist Lalo Creme (son of former 10cc and Godley & Creme member Lol Creme) and drummer Sebastian Beresford. Arkarna has enjoyed sold out tours in Europe, North America, Asia and Australia, as well as various headlining festival slots. The band is noted for its energetic live performances and for fusing many music genres.

== History ==
Formed by Ollie Jacobs in England in the mid-1990s, Arkarna debuted in 1997 with the album Fresh Meat. Jacobs (programmer and vocalist) had worked as an engineer and producer in his father's London studios, Rollover , from the age of 14. By the time he started the band, Jacobs had mixed for Dreadzone, Leftfield and Deep Forest.

Acoustic guitarist and backing vocalist James Barnett, formerly a member of Lunarci, recorded for Big Life Records and regularly appeared on the Megadog club scene. Lalo Creme, son of Lol Creme of Godley & Creme fame, joined after playing guitar for a series of Trevor Horn sessions. Creme was directed to Rollover Studios where Jacobs and Barnett were in the embryonic stage of forming a group.

The trio were signed to WEA Records by Clive Black and Raz Gold in June 1995 and later released their debut single "House on Fire" and the album, Fresh Meat. During this period they took the first steps in performing live, hiring drummer Sebastian Beresford before enrolled him as the fourth member before their 1997 tour of Australia. As a four-piece, they went on to tour across the world until after the release of their second album, The Family Album (2001).

In 2010, Arkarna joined forces with session musicians Tim Owen (drummer) and Dave Landers (bassist) to perform in front of over 30,000 fans for Java Rockin'land in Ancol Dreamland, Jakarta, Indonesia. They headlined alongside the Smashing Pumpkins and Stereophonics and were voted the festival favorite and instantly won the hearts of young Indonesian adults across the nation.

New material started to appear in 2011 for their third album; the first single from which was "Left Is Best". The promo video for "Left Is Best" first appeared on YouTube in December 2011.

With millions of loyal fans in Indonesia, on 20 October 2014 Arkarna was invited back by Indonesian President Joko Widodo to perform live in front of over 250,000 people at the presidential inauguration in the National Monument.

On 17 August 2015, the band were summoned back to Indonesia to launch their new single, "Kebyar-Kebyar", in the Indonesian language to celebrate the 70th anniversary of the independence of Indonesia.

== Music ==
Some of Arkarna's more popular songs are "House on Fire" and "Eat Me", both of which appeared on Arkarna's debut album Fresh Meat. "House on Fire" has featured on U.S. sitcom series Friends, The O.C. and also appeared on the Batman & Robin soundtrack. Another hit song from the Fresh Meat album, "So Little Time", was also the theme tune to Mary-Kate and Ashley Olsen's TV show in the U.S., So Little Time. Arkarna's The Family Album produced the singles "Skin", "Rehab" and the number one radio tune in Southeast Asia, "Life Is Free". Several other international inroads over the past decade included soundtracking Levi's ads and Honda TV commercials in the United States.

== Ollie Jacobs ==
Jacobs started out doing remixes for Frankie Goes to Hollywood ("Relax") before he went on to mix Leftfield's Leftism. Jacobs then began composing his own songs, and became the frontman of Arkarna. Jacobs was soon involved with East 17 and Take That and made an appearance on BBC One's Top of the Pops with Rozalla, performing behind the turntables on "Don't Go Lose It Baby".

Jacobs has also collaborated with various well-known artists and producers including Madonna, Trevor Horn, Art of Noise, Barry Manilow, The Prodigy, Skunk Anansie, William Orbit, Tinchy Stryder, Stooshe, and Boyzone. Early on, Jacobs wrote and produced the number No. 1 hit "Mysterious Girl" for Peter Andre. Additionally, he has mixed the track "Pop Your Cork" for the Stanton Warriors (which features Twista) and also collaborated with Dave Hedger under the name West London Deep. In 2013, Jacobs was voted 'Top UK Hit Songwriter' for writing and producing the Saturdays' number No. 1 hit "What About Us", which has sold over 500,000 copies in the UK, plus 120,000 copies in the US alone without even charting on the Billboard Hot 100.

== Discography ==
=== Albums ===
| Title | Album details | Peak chart positions |
| Title | Album details | AUS |
|---|---|---|
| Fresh Meat | Released: August 1997; Formats: CD; Label: Fume, Reprise Records | 78 |
| The Family Album | Released: March 2000; Label: WEA Records; Format: CD, LP | — |
| Music is my Therapy | Released: May 2013; Label: Self-released; Format: CD, LP, MP3 | — |

=== Singles ===
| Year | Single | Peak chart positions | | | Album |
| Year | Single | UK | AUS | US Dance | Album |
|---|---|---|---|---|---|
| 1995 | "Are You Scared" | — | — | — | Non-Album Single |
| 1996 | "House on Fire" (12 single) | — | — | — | Non-Album Single |
| 1997 | "Eat Me" | — | 69 | — | Fresh Meat |
| 1997 | "House on Fire" | 33 | — | 3 | Fresh Meat |
| 1997 | "So Little Time" | 46 | 167 | — | Fresh Meat |
| 1997 | "The Futures Overrated" | — | 69 | 12 | Fresh Meat |
| 1998 | "The Futures Overrated" (1998 Version) | 100 | — | — | Non-Album Single |
| 2000 | "Life Is Free" | — | — | — | The Family Album |
| 2000 | "Skin" | — | 127 | — | The Family Album |
| 2001 | "Rehab" | — | — | — | The Family Album |
| 2012 | "Strange Creature" | — | — | — | Music is my Therapy |
| 2012 | "Left Is Best" | — | — | — | Music is my Therapy |
| 2015 | "Kebyar-Kebyar" | — | — | — | Non-Album Single |

=== Remixes ===
- Art of Noise: "Yebo [The Arkarna Dub]" (1995)
