= Batman & Robin (soundtrack) =

1997 soundtrack album

Batman & Robin: Music from and Inspired by the "Batman & Robin" Motion Picture

Soundtrack album by various artists
- Released: May 27, 1997
- Recorded: September 1996–March 1997
- Genres: Alternative rock; pop rock; R&B; hip hop; electronica; techno
- Length: 67:06
- Label: Warner Bros.
- Producers: Danny Bramson (ex.); Gary LeMel (ex.); Nellee Hooper; Billy Corgan; DJ U-Neek; R. Kelly; Arkarna; Scott Litt; R.E.M.; Peter Collins; Sean Slade; Paul Q. Kolderie; Gary Clark; Soul Coughing; Róisín Murphy; Mark Brydon; David Gamson; Me'Shell NdegéOcello (co.); Eric Benét; George Nash Jr.; Demonté; Matthias Gohl; Rick Smith

Singles from Batman & Robin
- 1. "The End Is the Beginning Is the End" Released: May 20, 1997 (Europe); 2. "Gotham City" Released: June 3, 1997 (US); 3. "Look into My Eyes" Released: June 3, 1997 (US); 4. "True to Myself" Released: June 20, 1997 (US); 5. "Foolish Games" Released: July 8, 1997 (US); 6. "Moaner" Released: July 21, 1997 (Germany); 7. "Lazy Eye" Released: October 21, 1997 (Japan)

Professional ratings
Review scores
Source	Rating
AllMusic	2.5/5 stars
Filmtracks	3/5 stars
Entertainment Weekly	C

Batman & Robin: Music from and Inspired by the "Batman & Robin" Motion Picture is the soundtrack album to the motion picture Batman & Robin (1997).

== Background ==
Despite the overwhelming negative reception of the film itself, the soundtrack album for Batman & Robin was well-received, and became a sales success, being certified platinum by the RIAA. The soundtrack included songs by R. Kelly, Arkarna, Jewel, Goo Goo Dolls, R.E.M., Bone Thugs-n-Harmony, and The Smashing Pumpkins. The Smashing Pumpkins song "The End Is the Beginning Is the End", which played over the film's closing credits, won the 1998 Grammy Award for Best Hard Rock Performance. Three songs from the soundtrack became top-ten hits in the United States: Jewel's contribution, a radio-mix version of "Foolish Games" (US number two), Bone Thugs-n-Harmony's "Look into My Eyes" (US number four), and R. Kelly's "Gotham City" (US number nine). In addition, the track "Fun for Me" by relative newcomers Moloko reached number four on the US Dance Play Chart, and introduced the Irish-English act to a new American audience.

== Track listing ==
No.	Title	Writer(s)	Producer(s)	Length
1.	"The End Is the Beginning Is the End" (The Smashing Pumpkins)	Billy Corgan	Nellee Hooper; Corgan	5:10
2.	"Look into My Eyes" (Bone Thugs-n-Harmony)	Bone; DJ U-Neek	DJ U-Neek	4:28
3.	"Gotham City" (R. Kelly)	Robert Kelly	R. Kelly	4:56
4.	"House on Fire" (Arkarna)	Arkarna	Arkarna	3:24
5.	"Revolution" (R.E.M.)	Bill Berry; Peter Buck; Mike Mills; Michael Stipe	Scott Litt; R.E.M.	3:04
6.	"Foolish Games" (Jewel)	Jewel Kilcher	Peter Collins	4:00
7.	"Lazy Eye" (Goo Goo Dolls)	John Rzeznik	Sean Slade; Paul Q. Kolderie	3:46
8.	"Breed" (Lauren Christy)	Christy; Gary Clark	Clark	3:05
9.	"The Bug" (Soul Coughing)	Soul Coughing (music); Mike Doughty (lyrics)	Soul Coughing	3:09
10.	"Fun for Me" (Moloko)	Róisín Murphy; Mark Brydon	Murphy; Brydon	5:08
11.	"Poison Ivy" (Me'Shell NdegéOcello)	Jerry Leiber; Mike Stoller	David Gamson; NdegéOcello (co.)	3:33
12.	"True to Myself" (Eric Benét)	Benét; George Nash Jr.	Benét; Nash Jr.; Demonté	4:41
13.	"A Batman Overture" (Elliot Goldenthal)	Goldenthal	Matthias Gohl	3:35
14.	"Moaner" (Underworld)	Underworld	Rick Smith	10:17
15.	"The Beginning Is the End Is the Beginning" (The Smashing Pumpkins)	Corgan	Hooper; Corgan	4:58

== Personnel ==
- Executive album producers: Danny Bramson and Gary LeMel
- Executive in charge of music for Warner Bros. Pictures: Gary LeMel
- Music supervisor: Danny Bramson
- Album business affairs: Keith Zajic, Lisa B. Margolis and David Altschul
- Design: Lawrence Azerrad
- Soundtrack coordination: Jason Cienkus
- Mastering: Keith Blake at W.B.I.H.S.

== Batman & Robin (The Score) ==
The score to Batman & Robin was never commercially released.

== Charts ==
=== Album ===
Chart (1997)	Peak position
Australian Albums (ARIA)	31
Austrian Albums (Ö3 Austria)	13
Belgian Albums (Ultratop Flanders)	40
German Albums (Offizielle Top 100)	76
New Zealand Albums (RMNZ)	20
US Billboard 200	5

=== Singles ===
Title	Artist	Charts and peak positions											
Title	Artist	US	US Rock	AUS	AUT	CAN	GER	NL	NOR	NZ	SWE	SWI	UK
"The End Is the Beginning Is the End"	The Smashing Pumpkins	—^{[A]}	12	10	40	29	66	74	5	6	19	37	10
"Look into My Eyes"	Bone Thugs-n-Harmony	4^{[B]}	—	87	—	—	—	—	—	3	—	—	16
"Gotham City"	R. Kelly	9^{[C]}	—	100	7	37	6	9	10	20	9	9	9
"Foolish Games"	Jewel	2	—	12	—	2	—	10	—	23	—	—	—
"Moaner"	Underworld	—	—	—	—	—	69	—	—	—	—	—	89
"Lazy Eye"	Goo Goo Dolls	—	9	—	—	71	—	—	—	—	—	—	—

- A: "The End Is the Beginning Is the End" did not chart on the Billboard Hot 100, but did peak on the Billboard Hot 100 Airplay chart at number 50.
- B: "Look into My Eyes" also peaked on the Billboard Hot R&B/Hip-Hop Songs chart at number 4.
- C: "Gotham City" also peaked on the Billboard Hot R&B/Hip-Hop Songs chart at number 9.
- D: "Fun for Me" did not chart on the Billboard Hot 100, but did peak on the Billboard Hot Dance Club Play chart at number 4.

== Certifications ==
Region	Certification	Certified units/sales
United States (RIAA)	Platinum	1,000,000^{^}
^{^} Shipments figures based on certification alone.
