= Stratford Armouries =

Museum in Stratford-upon-Avon, England

Coordinates: 52.2262°N 1.7320°W

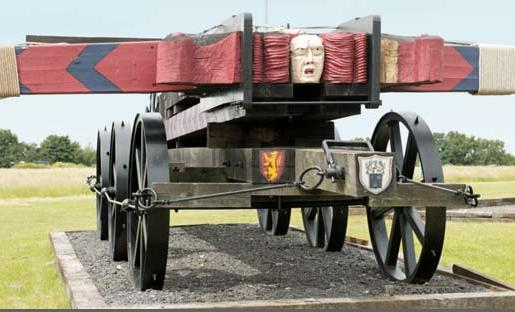
- Established: 2007
- Location: Gospel Oak Lane, Pathlow, Stratford on Avon
- Website: Stratford Armouries

Stratford Armouries is a small museum attached to the Stratford-upon-Avon Lodge Retreat, a hotel offering cabin-based accommodation located near to the village of Snitterfield, approx 4 miles from Straford-upon-Avon town centre. It consists of three rooms, one housing a collection of Churchill memorabilia, one with a First World War trench scene and the remains of a Wellington bomber, and one with artefacts from the airborne operation on the bridge at Bénouville in Normandy, better known as the Pegasus Bridge. Admission is free (as of August 2021).

== History ==
The Wigington family arrived in Warwickshire around 1750. In the nineteenth century James's Great Grandfather Thomas Mabbutt was the managing director of the Abingdon Gunworks Company in Birmingham manufacturing Snider, Chassepot and Martini guns. The family built a private collection of arms and armour during their 250 years in the trade and in 2007 the museum was built on an 86-acre (350,000 m^{2}) site - the former RAF Snitterfield in order to house the collection. It was open to the public and included a wide range of exhibits - the most noteworthy included a life-sized armoured Indian elephant, a cannon dating from 1450, and a giant crossbow modelled on Leonardo da Vinci's original design. The elephant armour was designed and constructed by Terry English, a famous armourer who has worked on several famous films including the Harry Potter series.

The museum struggled to make a profit however and in 2015 the majority of the collection was sold at auction. The site was then redeveloped as a lodge retreat hotel with the current smaller museum housed in an annex. It was re-opened in spring 2016. The redevelopment was initially opposed by the planning authorities, but was allowed on later appeal.

== Exhibits ==
There are four main exhibits in the museum housed in three rooms.

The largest room holds an interesting collection of Winston Churchill memorabilia built by Jack Darrah and his daughter Carol Harwood, with items from both Churchill’s political and personal life. The collection was originally sited at Bletchley Park.

The second room contains a reconstruction of a trench from the First World War and the remains of a Vickers Wellington bomber.

The third and smallest room contains various artefacts from the operation to seize control of the bridge at Bénouville in Normandy during the Second World War, better known as the Pegasus Bridge. This includes many interesting references to the gliders used in the assault.
