= Gotham City (song) =

1997 single by R. Kelly

Single by R. Kelly

from the album Batman & Robin soundtrack
- Released: June 3, 1997
- Genre: R&B; soul; gospel; pop
- Length: 4:55 (album and single version); 4:40 (radio edit)
- Label: Jive
- Songwriter: Robert Kelly
- Producer: R. Kelly

R. Kelly singles chronology
"I Believe I Can Fly" (1996)	"Gotham City" (1997)	"Be Careful" (1998)

"Gotham City" is a song by American R&B singer and songwriter R. Kelly, based on the fictional city of the same name. It was featured on the soundtrack to the film Batman & Robin, and was released as a single on June 3, 1997, by Jive Records. The song reached number nine on both the US Billboard Hot 100 and Hot R&B Singles charts. In Europe, it peaked within the top 10 in Austria, Germany, Hungary, the Netherlands, Norway, Sweden, Switzerland, and the United Kingdom. The music video for the song was directed by Hype Williams and filmed in New York City. A remix version for the song was released featuring rapper Strings with a video also directed by Williams.

== Critical reception ==
Larry Flick from Billboard magazine complimented the singer for "his spiritual side, infusing this atmospheric acoustic soul ballad with uplifting lyrics and a choral climax". He noted that "the whole tone and musical texture of this single are markedly different from anything that Kelly has previously recorded. It's a refreshing change that leaves you anticipating the direction he will take on his next album". Pan-European magazine Music & Media named it "a very well-crafted ballad". Alan Jones from Music Week described it as "a pretty, semi-acoustic ballad not a million miles away from some of the stuff Babyface does. It has a rousing chorus on which Kelly is aided and abetted by the soulful interjections of the Chi-Towne Gospel Machine and Tyrone's Kids. Another smash."

Programmer Vranz van Maaren at the Netherlands' leading station, AC outlet Sky 100.7 FM, commented: "In general I am not that R&B-minded but when I first saw the clip I was just blown away and when I contacted the record company (Zomba) they handed me a copy as soon as possible, because they were afraid that I'd change my mind if I found out it was R. Kelly". He also added: "The song is far less R&B than many of his previous efforts, and shows that he's able to broaden his potential audience a great deal without alienating his traditional fan base".

== Music video ==
The accompanying music video for "Gotham City" was directed by American director Hype Williams. It features Kelly driving his motorcycle around New York City. He also passes Times Square. Kelly also drives the Batmobile. Singer Sparkle is featured in video as a dancer. Williams also directed the music video for the remix of the song.

== Track listings ==
- "Gotham City"
1. "Gotham City" (LP version)
2. "Thank God It's Friday"
3. "Down Low (Nobody Has to Know)" (radio version)
4. "Gotham City" (acapella and music)
- "Gotham City" remix
1. "Gotham City" (LP version)
2. "Gotham City" (remix)
3. "Gotham City" (acapella and music)
4. "Gotham City" (instrumental)
5. "Gotham City" (remix instrumental)

== Charts ==
=== Weekly charts ===
Weekly chart performance for "Gotham City"
Chart (1997)	Peak position
Australia (ARIA)	100
Austria (Ö3 Austria Top 40)	7
Belgium (Ultratop 50 Flanders)	27
Belgium (Ultratop 50 Wallonia)	26
Canada (Nielsen SoundScan)	19
Canada Top Singles (RPM)	22
Canada Adult Contemporary (RPM)	45
Europe (Eurochart Hot 100)	15
Germany (GfK)	6
Hungary (Mahasz)	8
Iceland (Íslenski Listinn Topp 40)	18
Ireland (IRMA)	15
Israel (Israeli Singles Chart)	15
Netherlands (Dutch Top 40)	6
Netherlands (Single Top 100)	9
New Zealand (Recorded Music NZ)	20
Norway (VG-lista)	10
Scottish Singles Sales (Official Charts)	14
Sweden (Sverigetopplistan)	9
Switzerland (Schweizer Hitparade)	9
UK Singles (Official Charts)	9
UK Hip Hop/R&B (Official Charts)	3
US Billboard Hot 100	9
US Hot R&B/Hip-Hop Songs (Billboard)	9
US Pop Airplay (Billboard)	21
US Rhythmic Airplay (Billboard)	18

=== Year-end charts ===
Year-end chart performance for "Gotham City"
Chart (1997)	Position
Europe (Eurochart Hot 100)	68
Germany (Media Control)	39
Netherlands (Dutch Top 40)	36
Netherlands (Single Top 100)	36
Sweden (Topplistan)	56
Switzerland (Schweizer Hitparade)	18
UK Singles (OCC)	106
US Billboard Hot 100	70
US Hot R&B Singles (Billboard)	62

== Certifications ==
Certifications for "Gotham City"
Region	Certification	Certified units/sales
Germany (BVMI)	Gold	250,000^{^}
United States (RIAA)	Gold	600,000
^{^} Shipments figures based on certification alone.
