= Terry English =

British armourer

- Born: East End of London, England
- Occupations: Armourer, prop designer
- Years active: 1962–present
- Known for: Film and television armour; museum displays
- Notable work: Lancelot's armour (Excalibur), Henry VIII replica, Indian elephant armour

Terry English is a British armourer, mainly designing and making arms and armour, as well as props, for film and television productions. His work is held in museums such as the UK's Royal Armouries, and in private collections.

== Early life and career ==
English was born in the East End of London, and moved to Romford, Essex, when he was five. His father was a tailor and suit cutter. English began his career in 1962, employed by theatrical costumers L & H Nathans of Drury Lane, Covent Garden, London, working on props and metal parts of costumes. Many of the costumes that were hired out came back damaged, and under the tutelage of professionally-trained swordmaker Arthur West, English learned to repair them, and later to make new armour costumes and metal props. In the early 70s he set up his own company making theatrical armour and arms, including animal armour, such as for horses. The first film he made armour for through his own company was Mary, Queen of Scots (1971).

The armour worn by Lancelot in the 1981 film Excalibur is on display at the Royal Armouries in London, as is a copy he made of one of Henry VIII's suits of armour. In the 1980s English also made armour for the Education Department at the Royal Armouries.

English appeared in the 'making of' documentaries, The Making of Excalibur: Myth into Movie (1981), directed by Neil Jordan, and Behind the Sword in the Stone (2013). He had cameo roles in some of the movies for which he provided armour.

English works out of his workshop at his home near Hayle in Cornwall. When working on a movie, English will pack up his workshop and ship it to the filming location, so that he can undertake on-site costume making, fitting and repairs.

In 2014 an episode of the television show Shed and Buried with Henry Cole was devoted to English and his collection of vintage vehicles as well as his film memorabilia.

In June 2017 Adam Savage spent eight days with English at his workshop in Cornwall, making a recreation of King Arthur's armour suit from Excalibur. This was filmed and released in the Tested.com series as Adam Savage's Armor Build in October 2017.

English is listed by the UK's Heritage Crafts Association as one of the few craftspeople currently practising the art of armour- and helmet-making. A 2019 profile in Country Life described English as 'widely acknowledged as the best armourer in the world'.

== Museum displays and exhibitions ==
- The Lancelot suit from Excalibur is held in the collections of the Royal Armouries at the Royal Armouries Museum.
- A life-size armour suit for an Indian elephant, designed and made by English, is displayed at Stratford Armouries.
- A large collection of armour by English was featured in the 2010 exhibition '75 Years of Twentieth Century Fox' at the London Film Museum.
- The 2016 exhibition 'Way of the Warrior: Epic Movies and Armour' at Forge Mill Needle Museum featured a full suit of armour designed and made by English for Sir Galahad in King Arthur.
- The 2016 exhibition 'All Monsters Great and Small' at the Royal Cornwall Museum featured English's work.

== Selected films with armour and/or props designed and made by English ==
- 1965 Doctor Zhivago
- 1966 Fahrenheit 451
- 1968 The Lion in Winter
- 1968 The Charge of the Light Brigade
- 1971 Mary, Queen of Scots
- 1977 Jabberwocky
- 1981 Excalibur
- 1984 Sword of the Valiant
- 1986 Aliens
- 1986 Highlander
- 1988 High Spirits
- 1992 Alien 3
- 1995 First Knight
- 1997 Batman & Robin
- 1998 The Man in the Iron Mask
- 1999 The Messenger: The Story of Joan of Arc
- 1999 The 13th Warrior
- 2000 Gladiator
- 2001 A.I. Artificial Intelligence
- 2001-2011 Harry Potter films
- 2004 King Arthur
- 2005 Kingdom of Heaven
- 2010 Clash of the Titans
- 2010 Robin Hood
- 2011 Sucker Punch
- 2013 Thor: The Dark World
- 2017 Transformers: The Last Knight
- 2025 Dracula
