= RAF Snitterfield =

Former RAF station in Warwickshire, England

RAF Snitterfield
- Snitterfield, Warwickshire in England
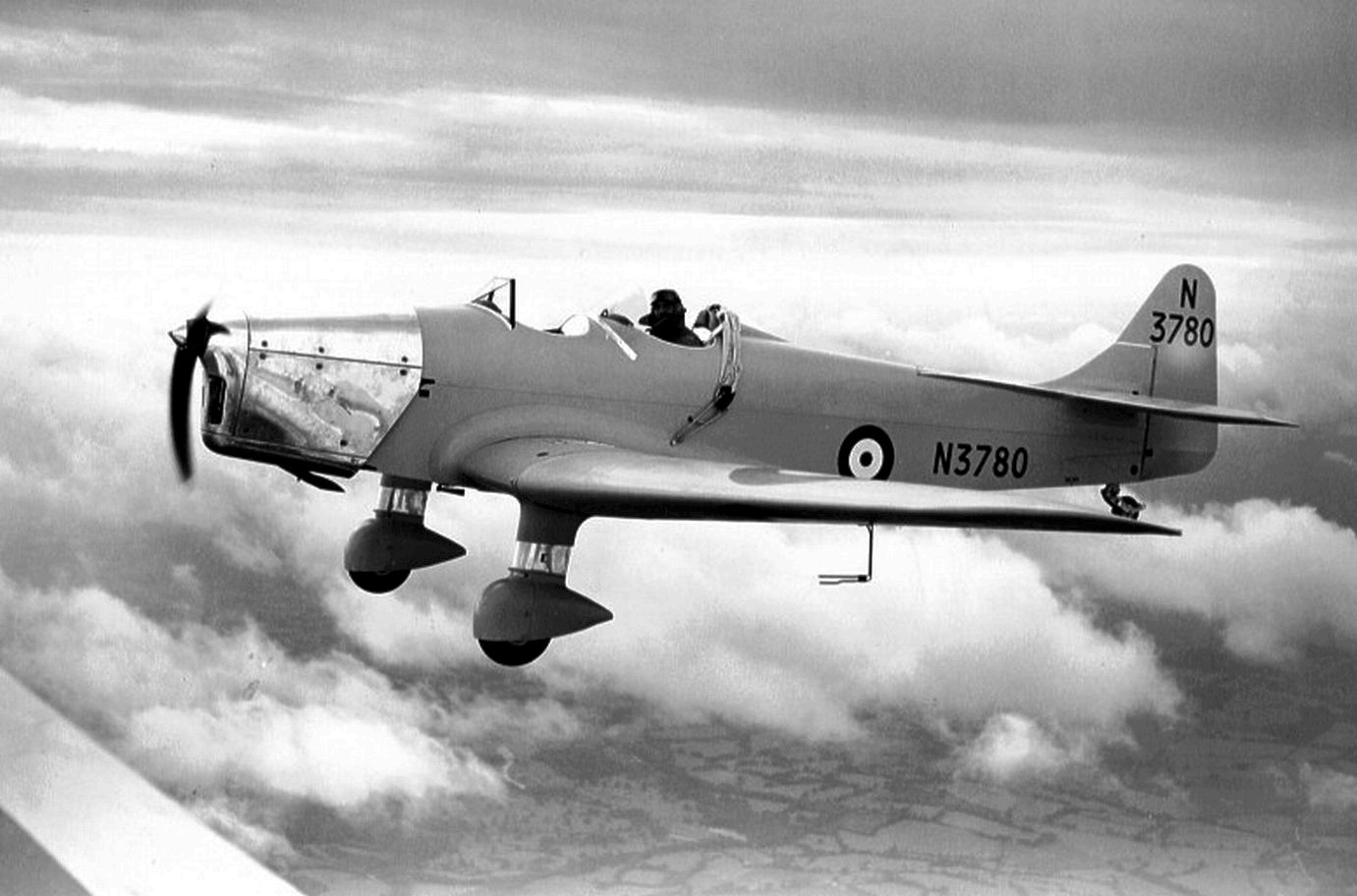
- A Miles Magister similar to the ones that flew from the airfield

Site information
- Type: Satellite Station
- Owner: Air Ministry
- Operator: Royal Air Force
- Controlled by: RAF Flying Training Command

Location
- Shown within Warwickshire RAF Snitterfield (the United Kingdom)
- Coordinates: 52°14′14″N 001°43′08″W

Site history
- Built: 1942
- In use: 1943 - 1946
- Battles/wars: European theatre of World War II

Airfield information
- Elevation: 116 metres (381 ft) AMSL
Runways
| Direction | Length and surface |
|---|---|
| 02/20 | 1,750 metres (5,741 ft) Tarmac |
| 08/26 | 1,131 metres (3,711 ft) Tarmac |
| 14/32 | 1,177 metres (3,862 ft) Tarmac |

RAF Snitterfield is a former Royal Air Force satellite station located west of Snitterfield, Warwickshire, England, 3.3 miles (5.3 km) north of Stratford-upon-Avon and 4.6 miles (7.4 km) south-east of Henley-in-Arden, Warwickshire.

Snitterfield was operational during the Second World War, the airfield was a class A airfield and had around 30 aircraft dispersals. The airfield was finished around June 1942 and cost around £1,147,000 and opened in 1943 then closed in 1946.

== Posted units ==
No. 18 (Pilots) Advanced Flying Unit RAF ((P)AFU) was the first unit to operate from the airfield starting on 7 May 1943 at RAF Church Lawford and using Snitterfield as a satellite airfield to disperse the aircraft as Church Lawford was very busy. On 3 April 1945 the unit moved permanently to RAF Snitterfield using Airspeed Oxfords and Miles Magisters.

The airfield was also home to two Belgian training schools firstly the Initial Training School dealing with reception and training elements from 1 January 1944 until 13 December 1944 and secondly the Technical Training School from January 1944 until October 1946.

From May 1945 to 1946, Snitterfield was used as a Relief Landing Ground by No. 20 Service Flying Training School from RAF Church Lawford.

The airfield was also host to other units including:

- No. 1533 Beam Approach Training Flight which joined in 1944 flying the Airspeed Oxford left 3 April 1945.
- No. 21 Flying Training School flying the North American Harvard joined the airfield on 3 April 1945 until 18 September 1946.

== Accidents and incidents ==
During life as a RAF training base accidents were not far away with a number of airmen killed during training and within the surrounding area.

| Date | Incident | Reference |
|---|---|---|
| 1 September 1942 | Bristol Beaufighter X7943 YD-P of No. 255 Squadron RAF dived into the ground during an electrical storm. | |
| 14 February 1944 | Vickers Wellington HZ110 of 22 OTU was diverted to the airfield in bad weather, where the bomber crashed after seven attempts to land. | |
| 10 July 1944 | Airspeed Oxford NM278 of 18 (P)AFU made a violent recovery from a diving turn, causing the wings to break away. | |
| 25 July 1944 | Wellington HF610 of 22 OTU belly landed. | |
| 26 August 1944 | Miles Magister T9895 of 18 (P)AFU crashed on landing. | |

== Motor sports usage ==
In 1948, RAF Snitterfield was one of two disused airfields given special consideration as to the suitability of hosting a British Grand Prix. In the end, RAF Silverstone was chosen as the venue.

== Current use ==
The north-east section of the airfield is currently the Stratford Oaks Golf club and the south-east section is home to Stratford-Upon-Avon Gliding Club. However, before these were built there was a Wireless Transmission station.

At the southern end of the airfield is now Stratford Armouries which is a military museum that was built in 2007.

== See also ==
- List of former Royal Air Force stations
