= RAF Church Lawford =

Former RAF base in Warwickshire, England

RAF Church Lawford
- Church Lawford, Warwickshire in England
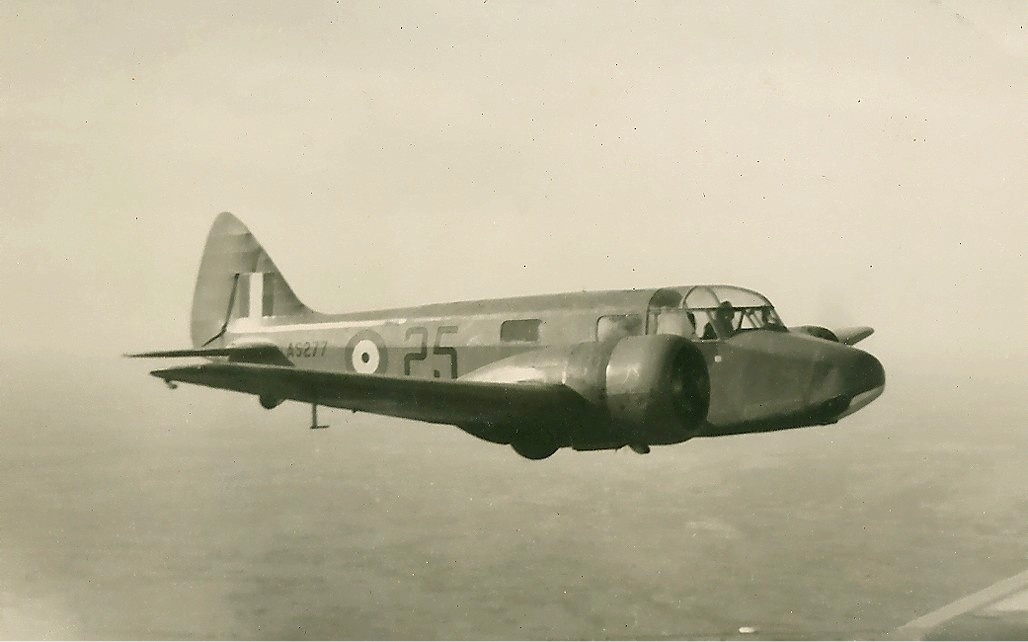
- A Airspeed AS.10 Oxford similar to the ones that flew from the airfield

Site information
- Type: Royal Air Force station
- Owner: Air Ministry
- Operator: Royal Air Force
- Controlled by: RAF Flying Training Command

Location
- Shown within Warwickshire RAF Church Lawford (the United Kingdom)
- Coordinates: 52°21′5″N 001°20′31″W

Site history
- Built: 1941
- In use: 1941 – 1955
- Battles/wars: European theatre of World War II

Airfield information
- Elevation: 116 metres (381 ft) AMSL
Runways
Direction	Length and surface
03/21	1,100 metres (3,609 ft) Concrete
08/26	1,170 metres (3,839 ft) Concrete
16/34	1,200 metres (3,937 ft) Concrete

Royal Air Force Church Lawford or more simply RAF Church Lawford is a former Royal Air Force station located 1.5 mi (2.4 km) south of Church Lawford, Warwickshire, England, 3 miles (4.8 km) south-west of Rugby, Warwickshire.

The airfield opened in April 1941 and was used by the RAF for pilot training until it closed in 1955.

== Based units ==
A number of Beam Approach units flew from the airfield like when No. 1509 (Beam Approach Training) Flight RAF (BAT Flt) arrived flying Airspeed Oxfords from 6 June 1942 and No. 1533 (Beam Approach Training) Flight RAF (BAT Flt) which again flew Oxfords from 27 October 1942 until April 1945.

The first unit to use the airfield was No. 2 Central Flying School flying Oxfords and Avro Tutors from 15 June 1941 until 13 January 1942 when it was renamed No. 1 Flying Instructors School (FIS) flying Oxfords and Tutors carried on until October 1942. The unit was again renamed to No. 18 (Pilots) Advanced Flying Unit RAF ((P)AFU) flying Oxfords and Boulton Paul Defiants on 27 October 1942 and operated until April 1945. Again the name was changed to No. 20 Flying Training School RAF (FTS) flying North American Harvards from 3 April 1945 using RAF Snitterfield as a relief landing ground (RLG) until March 1948.

A further two flying schools used the airfield after the end of the Second World War. The first was No. 20 Service Flying Training School RAF flying Harvards using RAF Snitterfield as a RLG until 1947, which like the wartime units at the airfield was renamed No. 2 Flying Training School RAF starting on 23 July 1947 and operating until 6 April 1948.

=== Other units ===
A small number of other units was present at RAF Church Lawford during its lifetime such as No. 68 Maintenance Unit RAF which operated from 1 December 1954 until 27 March 1955 and as a sub-site of No. 68 Maintenance Unit between 27 March 1955 and 30 November 1956.

No. 2798 Squadron RAF Regiment was also here at some point.

=== Airfield Construction Branch ===
In 1948 The Airfield Construction Branch moved to the airfield with the plant training school moving to Ryton on Dunsmore before moving to Lichfield in 1953.

== Accidents and incidents ==
During life as a RAF training base, accidents were not far away with a number of airmen killed during training. These are just a select few:

Date	Incident	Reference
22 November 1942	Oxford R6145 of 18 PAFU overshot landing and crashed at Bretford. P/O Victor André Brayer (Jean Pierre Hinque) of the Free French air force was killed.	
8 May 1944	Oxford HN440 of 18 ((P)AFU) struck a tree at night while force landing following engine failure.	
14 October 1944	Handley Page Halifax MZ920 of 434 Squadron crashed at Church Lawford after catching fire in the air.	
21 August 1946	Harvard FT359 of No. 20 Service Flying Training School undershot landing.	
9 January 1948	Harvard FS725 of No. 2 Flying Training School belly landed.	

== Current use ==
The site of the airfield has been turned into a quarry called Ling Hall and the Lawford Heath Industrial Estate.
