= A Positive Rage =

Live album by The Hold Steady
- Released: April 7, 2009
- Recorded: 2006–2007
- Genre: Rock
- Label: Vagrant

The Hold Steady chronology
| Stay Positive (2008) | A Positive Rage (2009) | Heaven Is Whenever (2010) |

Professional ratings
Review scores
| Source | Rating |
|---|---|
| Gigwise.com | link |
| The Skinny | link |
| Drowned in Sound | link |
| PopMatters | link |
| Uncut | link |
| Rolling Stone | link |
| IGN | 7.9/10 link |
| Pitchfork Media | link |

A Positive Rage is a live album and documentary double-disc set by the Brooklyn-based rock band The Hold Steady, released on April 7, 2009 by Vagrant Records. The documentary DVD features backstage interviews, fan commentary and live footage, while the CD features a live set performed on Halloween 2007 at the Metro Chicago in Chicago, Illinois, made up of songs from the band's albums Almost Killed Me (2004), Separation Sunday (2005), Boys and Girls in America (2006), and the then-forthcoming Stay Positive (2008), as well as three tracks previously only released as bonus tracks on these albums. The enhanced CD also includes a link to download five bonus tracks.

Prior to its release, keyboardist and backing vocalist Franz Nicolay noted, "It was an exciting time. The live record is taken from the very end of two years of touring behind Boys and Girls in America, and I'm glad we recorded then, because it's the real peak of the band as a performing unit."

== CD track listing ==
1. "Intro" – 0:23
2. "Stuck Between Stations" – 4:00
3. "The Swish" – 4:09
4. "Chips Ahoy" – 3:21
5. "Massive Nights" – 2:55
6. "Ask Her for Adderall" – 2:58
7. "Barfruit Blues" – 3:37
8. "Same Kooks" – 3:02
9. "You Gotta Dance (With Who You Came With)" – 2:26
10. "Lord, I'm Discouraged" – 5:30
11. "You Can Make Him Like You" – 3:09
12. "Your Little Hoodrat Friend" – 5:26
13. "Southtown Girls" – 5:53
14. "Citrus" – 2:57
15. "First Night" – 5:25
16. "Girls Like Status" – 4:12
17. "Killer Parties" – 10:41

== Bonus downloadable tracks ==
The enhanced CD includes a link to download five bonus tracks, the first three of which were available, as a single twelve-minute track, on the limited-edition version of Stay Positive.

1. "Ask Her for Adderall" – 2:47
2. "Cheyenne Sunrise" – 4:15
3. "Two Handed Handshake" – 4:15
4. "40 Bucks" – 3:58
5. "Spectres" – 3:47

== Personnel ==
- Bobby Drake – drums
- Craig Finn – guitar, vocals, art direction, photography
- Tad Kubler – lead guitar
- Franz Nicolay – keyboards, accordion, harmonica
- Galen Polivka – bass guitar
- John Agnello – mixing
- Greg Calbi – mastering
- Ben Goetting – design, layout design
- Craig McQuiston – photography
