= Teeth Dreams =

Studio album by the Hold Steady
- Released: March 25, 2014
- Recorded: 2013
- Studio: Rock Falcon (Franklin, Tennessee)
- Genre: Indie rock; alternative rock; heartland rock
- Length: 48:39
- Label: Washington Square/Razor & Tie
- Producer: Nick Raskulinecz

The Hold Steady chronology
Heaven Is Whenever (2010)	Teeth Dreams (2014)	Thrashing Thru the Passion (2019)

Teeth Dreams is the sixth studio album by American indie rock band the Hold Steady, released March 25, 2014, on Washington Square/Razor & Tie. Produced by Nick Raskulinecz, the album is the first to feature guitarist Steve Selvidge, who joined the band in 2010 to tour in support of the band's previous album, Heaven Is Whenever (2010).

== Background ==
Following the departure of keyboard player Franz Nicolay, and the release of their fifth studio album, Heaven Is Whenever (2010), the Hold Steady embarked upon an extensive world tour with additional members Steve Selvidge (guitar) and Dan Neustadt (keyboards). Regarding their entry into the Hold Steady, Selvidge noted, "[The band] decided to keep it to the core four members, and were looking for a hired-gun keyboard player. At that point, I think Tad said, if we're bringing in a new keyboard player, I want a second guitarist too, and I want it to be Steve." The band had previously known Selvidge through his bands the Bloodthirsty Lovers and the Secret Service. By 2011, Neustadt was no longer performing with the band, and Selvidge was added to the core line-up. Vocalist and guitarist Craig Finn noted: "We are rolling without keys right now. We did some shows without keys and we really liked it. It sort of opened things up for us."

Upon the tour's completion, the Hold Steady took a five-month hiatus from band activities. Craig Finn recorded and released a solo album, entitled Clear Heart Full Eyes (2012), stating, "I wanted to do something with a little more storytelling and a lot less volume." Reconvening in June 2012, the band began writing new material and released a limited edition single for Record Store Day in April 2013, which included the tracks "The Bear and the Maiden Fair" and "Criminal Fingers". Featuring lyrics written by George R. R. Martin, "The Bear and the Maiden Fair" appeared in the HBO television series, Game of Thrones. Regarding the single release, Kubler noted, "[Steve] wasn't in the band when we did the last record so we haven't formally released anything that he's played on – other than an iTunes session, or something like that. Having been away for a few years, we thought this would be a great opportunity to reintroduce the newest version of the band."

== Writing and composition ==
The band began writing Teeth Dreams in June 2012. Prior to the writing process, Finn stated, "It's hard to tell where the new one will go. [...] I'm curious whether it will be an extension of [Heaven Is Whenever], or if it will be a return to what we did before." Guitarist Tad Kubler elaborated, "“The general consensus may have been that our last record felt like it was maybe rushed a little bit, so I know speaking for myself personally, I want to be really careful not to do that – to be like, 'Oh shit, we need to get a record out and go on tour.’ Going into this, everybody realized that it was going to take as long as it takes."

The nine-minute 'Oaks', Kubler explained, "came out of my total obsession with Radiohead's 'Exit Music (For a Film)'. It was inspired by how well they do that kind of very cinematic thing."

== Release ==
The release of Teeth Dreams was announced on January 8, 2014, with guitarist Tad Kubler stating: "We’re really proud of our new record. This is an exciting time for us. Making the new record has been a journey for the band, and the results exceeded even our own expectations. Can't wait for people to hear it."

On January 23, 2014, the band released the first track from Teeth Dreams, "I Hope This Whole Thing Didn't Frighten You".

== Critical reception ==
Professional ratings
Review scores
Source	Rating
AllMusic	4/5 stars
Alternative Press	4/5 stars
Consequence of Sound	D
Cuepoint (Expert Witness)	(2-star Honorable Mention)
The Observer	4/5 stars
Pitchfork	6.4/10
Rolling Stone	3.5/5 stars
USA Today	3.5/4 stars

Jon Dolan of Rolling Stone noted that "frontman Craig Finn is still finding new ways to chronicle the underside of dead-end partying. The Brooklyn crew's punked-up bar-band rock is more streamlined now. But the addition of a second guitarist makes for a big sound that gives Finn more room for detail and nuance." Kitty Empire of The Observer said, "Teeth Dreams is, in many ways, the big record they have long been threatening to make... This time around, the band are also packing more firepower in the strings, in the form of third guitarist Steve Selvidge, who fills the gap left by the 2010 departure of keyboard player Franz Nicolay; producer Nick Raskulinecz, meanwhile, a veteran of Foo Fighters jobs, is tasked with reclassifying the Hold Steady from indie rock to something more ear-pinning. As well as all the customary riffing and chiming, there's now ample opportunity for Kubler and Selvidge to duel... This album takes anxiety as a theme, but it sounds materially less neurotic than their previous records, for good and ill." At USA Today, Jerry Shriver rated the album three-and-a-half stars out of four, writing that "Blue-collar rock and gritty story-songs of desperation and sketchy connections infuse the Brooklyn band's powerful sixth album. Ferocious, chiming guitars frame Craig Finn's half-spoken narratives of lives on the edge."

== Track listing ==
All songs written by Craig Finn, Tad Kubler and Steve Selvidge, except as shown.

1. "I Hope This Whole Thing Didn't Frighten You" (Finn, Kubler) – 4:01
2. "Spinners" (Finn, Kubler) – 5:24
3. "The Only Thing" – 4:33
4. "The Ambassador" – 5:12
5. "On with the Business" – 4:04
6. "Big Cig" – 4:17
7. "Wait a While" – 3:37
8. "Runner's High" (Finn, Selvidge) – 4:12
9. "Almost Everything" (Finn, Kubler) – 4:17
10. "Oaks" (Finn, Kubler) – 9:01

=== UK iTunes bonus tracks ===
11. "Records & Tapes" – 4:12
12. "Saddle Shoes" – 4:12
13. "Look Alive" – 3:44

=== 2-LP vinyl track listing ===
Side one

1. "I Hope This Whole Thing Didn't Frighten You" – 4:01
2. "Spinners" – 5:24
3. "The Only Thing" – 4:33

Side two

1. "The Ambassador" – 5:12
2. "On with the Business" – 4:04
3. "Saddle Shoes" – 4:12

Side three

1. "Big Cig" – 4:17
2. "Wait a While" – 3:37
3. "Runner's High" – 4:12

Side four

1. "Almost Everything" – 4:17
2. "Oaks" – 9:01

== Personnel ==
The Hold Steady

- Bobby Drake
- Craig Finn
- Tad Kubler
- Galen Polivka
- Steve Selvidge

Additional personnel

- Al Gamble – piano and keyboards

Production

- Nick Raskulinecz – producer
- John "Don Gannon" Albritton – assistant engineer
- Nathan Yarbourgh – assistant engineer
- Adam Fuchs – art direction
- Mastered by Ted Jensen at Sterling Sound, New York City

== Charts ==
Year (2014)	Peak position
UK Albums (OCC)	50
US Billboard 200	28
US Top Alternative Albums (Billboard)	4
US Top Rock Albums (Billboard)	5
