= Heaven Is Whenever =

Studio album by the Hold Steady
- Released: May 4, 2010
- Genre: Indie rock; heartland rock
- Length: 41:21
- Label: Vagrant; Rough Trade
- Producer: Dean Baltulonis; Tad Kubler

The Hold Steady chronology
Stay Positive (2008)	Heaven Is Whenever (2010)	Teeth Dreams (2014)

Professional ratings
Review scores
Source	Rating
AllMusic	4/5 stars
AbsolutePunk	(91%)
BBC	(positive)
Drowned in Sound	6/10 stars
NME	8/10 stars
Pitchfork	(6.2/10)
Q	6/10 stars
Rolling Stone	4/5 stars
The Skinny	5/5 stars
Slant	4.5/5 stars
Spin	5/5 stars
Sputnikmusic	4/5 stars

Heaven Is Whenever is the fifth studio album by the Hold Steady. It was released May 4, 2010, on Vagrant Records in the U.S. and May 3, 2010, on Rough Trade in Europe. The album's first single, "Hurricane J", premiered on Pitchfork Media on March 22, 2010. Regarding the album's lyrical content, vocalist and guitarist Craig Finn states that: "I kept saying Stay Positive was a record about trying to age gracefully. This record, I think actually was us aging gracefully. Some of the lyrics come from a place of a little more wisdom, being 38 and at this point having a lifetime in rock'n'roll."

Heaven Is Whenever debuted at #26 on the Billboard 200 with 23,000 albums sold in its opening week thus becoming the highest-charting album by The Hold Steady.

== Background and recording ==
In 2009, the Hold Steady began writing Heaven Is Whenever while touring in support of their previous album, Stay Positive. According to guitarist Tad Kubler, the band "turned the back lounge of the [tour] bus into a makeshift vocal booth where we could also overdub guitars. These songs gradually became the demos for the new record, and we continued writing. It allowed us to work at a pace that was dictated almost solely by our creative output. We just hit record whenever we thought we had something worth putting down."

The band subsequently entered the studio with Dean Baltulonis, producer of the band's debut album, Almost Killed Me, and its follow-up Separation Sunday. Vocalist and guitarist Craig Finn states that Baltulonis is "a real close friend, so it was kind of a more relaxed, less formal way of making a record. We kind of went in for shorter sessions over a longer period of time, and we recorded a lot. There's a fair amount of songs that didn't make the record, and that's always a heartbreaking thing, choosing between your favorite children."

The album does not feature former keyboard player and multi-instrumentalist Franz Nicolay, who left the band in January 2010. Guitarist Tad Kubler and additional musician Dan Neustadt, however, both perform piano and keyboards on the album in a diminished role in comparison to the band's previous two releases. Craig Finn states that: "I think the biggest difference is that a lot of the songs were written with no piano or keys. So there's a sense of space in it that I don’t think we've had since Separation Sunday."

== Content and influences ==
Guitarist Tad Kubler has stated that "musical scores" and "cinematic soundscapes" were major influences when composing the album, listing Gustavo Santaolalla, Terence Blanchard, Jon Brion as key examples.

Vocalist and guitarist Craig Finn states that the album's lyrics "speak a lot about struggle and reward. It's about embracing suffering and understanding its place in a joyful life. I think that some of the characters from old records are there, but I don't name them by name. I think it continues to examine the highs and lows that we've looked at on previous records."

The title of the album comes from the lyric "Heaven is whenever we can get together", from the song We Can Get Together.

"We Can Get Together" references the British twee-pop band Heavenly, as well as hardcore punk band Hüsker Dü who, like The Hold Steady, had their roots in Minneapolis, Minnesota.

== Release ==
On February 23, 2010, Heaven Is Whenever was announced for release in three months' time; alongside this, the album's track listing was posted online. On March 16, 2010, the artwork was revealed. On April 2, 2010, "The Weekenders" was made available for streaming through MTV's website.

The band released four songs via the internet before the album release, "Hurricane J", "Rock Problems", "The Weekenders," and "Barely Breathing". All four songs contain the band's trademark anthemic choruses and nostalgic, hyper-literate lyrics, leading some critics to doubt Finn's claim that the album will be a departure from the previous three. Heaven Is Whenever was made available for streaming through NPR on April 20, 2010, before it was released on May 4, 2010. It was promoted with a handful of shows on the West and East Coasts, prior to various festivals across Europe through to July 2010. Following this, they went on a North American tour with support from the Whigs.

The album was released one month early for Record Store Day 2010 on clear vinyl in a hand screen-printed sleeve, fewer than 600 copies were released globally. The album also included an online download code that became functional on the album's official release on May 4, 2010.

== Track listing ==
All songs written by Craig Finn and Tad Kubler, except where noted.

1. "The Sweet Part of the City" – 4:24
2. "Soft in the Center" – 3:50
3. "The Weekenders" – 3:48
4. "The Smidge" – 3:22
5. "Rock Problems" (Finn, Kubler, John Reis) – 3:31
6. "We Can Get Together" – 4:29
7. "Hurricane J" (Finn, Kubler, Franz Nicolay) – 3:02
8. "Barely Breathing" – 3:37
9. "Our Whole Lives" – 4:00
10. "A Slight Discomfort" – 7:13

=== iTunes bonus tracks ===
11. "Touchless" – 3:34
12. "Ascension Blues" – 2:59

=== 2020 Super Deluxe Edition ===
1. "Separate Vacations" – 3:48
2. "Criminal Fingers" – 4:39
3. "Beer on the Bedstand" – 2:54
4. "At Least Not Tonight" – 3:01
5. "Wonderful Struggle" - 3:24
6. "Going on a Hike" – 4:26
7. "We Can Get Together (Alternate)" - 4:57

== Personnel ==
The following people contributed to Heaven Is Whenever:

The Hold Steady

- Craig Finn – vocals, guitar
- Tad Kubler – guitar, keyboards, backing vocals
- Galen Polivka – bass guitar, backing vocals
- Bobby Drake – drums, percussion, backing vocals

Additional musicians

- Dan Neustadt – additional piano and keyboards
- Corinne Caouette – additional vocals
- Roman Kubler – additional vocals
- John Reis – additional guitar
- Peter Hess – horns, horn arrangements
- Lloyd DeBonis – horns

Recording personnel

- Dean Baltulonis – producer, recording, mixing
- Tad Kubler – additional production
- Dustin Miller – additional engineering
- Adam Armstrong – assistant engineer
- Shawn Kimon – assistant engineer
- Dave Gardner – mastering

Artwork

- Christian Helms – art direction, design
- Erick Montes – design
- Andrew Yates – photography

== Charts ==
Chart performance
Chart (2010)	Peak position
Australian Hitseekers Albums (ARIA)	5
Canadian Albums (Nielsen SoundScan)	59
Greek Albums (IFPI)	19
Irish Albums (IRMA)	71
Norwegian Albums (VG-lista)	20
Scottish Albums (OCC)	38
UK Albums (OCC)	45
UK Independent Albums (OCC)	1
US Billboard 200	26
US Independent Albums (Billboard)	4
US Indie Store Album Sales (Billboard)	5
US Top Alternative Albums (Billboard)	5
US Top Rock Albums (Billboard)	8
