= The Debutante Hour =

Musical trio

- Origin: New York City
- Genres: Anti-folk, cabaret, vaudeville
- Instruments: accordion, cello, baritone ukulele, drums
- Years active: 2007 - present
- Members: Susan Hwang; Mia Pixley; Maria Sonevytsky
- Website: www.thedebutantehour.com

The Debutante Hour are a trio, based in New York City, consisting of multi-instrumentalists Susan Hwang, Mia Pixley, and Maria Sonevytsky. Typically, Sonevytsky and Hwang trade off accordion and primary vocal duties, and Pixley plays cello, as well as providing additional vocals. Hwang and Sonevytsky also alternate playing "hobo drum kit", consisting of a mini bass drum and firecracker snare (usually with brushes), while standing. The group's approach spans a variety of styles, and includes elements of close harmony, vaudeville, cabaret, and Americana.

== Background ==
The band's official bio states: "The group formed as a duo in 2007 when Maria Sonevytsky and Susan Hwang joined songwriting forces and fashion sensibilities. In addition to playing their favorite NYC venues, they toured Far East Asia (South Korea, Japan) and Europe (Germany, Poland, Czech Republic, Ukraine, Italy, UK). Mia Pixley joined them in 2008 and has added to a fuller sound and irrepressible energy."

Hwang's songs have been described as "oddly amusing love songs about zombies and bed-bugs" and in reference to their debut album, The Birth and Death of Meaning, it has been stated "For as much as The Debutante Hour have an obvious penchant for absurdity, a closer listen reveals three women actually trying to make sense of their world through a dark humour."

Their music has also been described as "antifolk songs with the occasional waltz, warming up the audience to clap along and cheer" and "songs about lost love, weird love and the devil."

One of their UK shows (with the notable Shonen Knife), at the Brixton Windmill, was also reviewed favorably, the reviewer writing, "my favourite of the evening were the openers – The Debutante Hour. Visitors from New York and, according to the various researches I have done since, part of the anti-folk scene over there".

Their song "Croak Hiss and Sputter" has been described as a "shindig tribute to a relationship’s tribulations, all in the manner that a cheeky trumpet personifies, not quite daring to expose its true feelings by using the most upbeat of formulas." They have also been described as having a "bouncy, cabaret style."

The Birth and Death of Meaning (named after the book by Ernest Becker) was produced by Franz Nicolay, formerly of The Hold Steady. Nicolay is also credited with "additional engineering, guitars, glockenspiel, mandola, keys, baritone ukulele, ukulele, banjo, additional vox and percussion." Drummer Brian Viglione (The Dresden Dolls) is also listed as a collaborator (drums on the songs "Your Worldview Gets Me Down", "Sunday In The Trailer", "Zombies Are Zen", "Croak, Hiss & Sputter", and "Be Yourself"). On March 5, 2011, the group released their 6 track EP Follow Me, a collection of cover songs from artists as varied as Ric Ocasek, The Ronnettes, and The Flaming Lips. It also includes the group's cover of TLC's "No Scrubs", a longtime fixture of their live set. The EP was produced by Franz Nicolay and Matt Roth. The group also released an original Christmas-themed song in December 2011, entitled "I'm Afraid of Christmas", as a free download.

Sonevytsky and Hwang sang on "Slapped Actress," off 2008 The Hold Steady album Stay Positive.

The group has self-produced a handful of colorful and highly visual music videos. The videos are conceived, directed, and shot collaboratively by the group (and edited by Sonevytsky), in such diverse locations as Seoul, Korea; Padova, Italy; Prague, Czech Republic; Wrocław, Poland; and Wetzlar, Germany. The group's first video, "Hammer, Hatchet, Chainsaw, Gun" was directed by Thomas Bayne.

Two of the group's videos have been in the form of humorous, tongue-in-cheek send-ups of the public service announcement format, delivered in song, and composed of original material.

Their videos have included guest appearances by fellow New York City musicians, notably Amy Kohn and Franz Nicolay.

== Additional projects ==
In April 2010, Sonevytsky and Hwang performed in the Off-Off-Broadway production Scythian Stones at La MaMa Experimental Theatre Club, each in the role of "Denizen of the Great Below", about which OffOffOnline wrote: "Add in the antics of The Debutante Hour (not only presenting their strong voices but also doing that while playing drums, guitar, and accordion), and the hour-long performance builds what good theater should always build: an alternate world that allows us to re-learn and reflect upon the great questions at the core of our being human." Nytheatre.com wrote: "Gorgeous Ukrainian and Kyrgyz traditional songs performed by women with exquisite voices, accompanied elegantly by ancient instruments, as well as stunning changes of tone with the contemporary duo 'The Debutante Hour,' combine to create a beautiful soundscape through the simple story of two daughters leaving their mothers and losing their cultural identities in the process. Scythian Stones is unlike anything I've heard before." In September 2010, they travelled with the production to Asia, performing in Bishkek, Kyrgyzstan and Kyiv, Ukraine. While in Kyrgyzstan, they also played a show at the American University of Central Asia, as The Debutante Hour.

Sonevytsky is a member of the composer/performer collective Anti-Social Music.

Hwang joined fellow Anti-folk act Ching Chong Song as a third member on their second album, Everything is for the Babies, playing accordion, janggu (a traditional Korean drum), and providing a third vocal harmony.

Sonevytsky also collaborated with photographer Alison Cartwright to create an art exhibit, No Other Home: The Crimean Tatar Repatriates which was on display at The Ukrainian Museum from May 16, 2010 until September 26, 2010. Sonevytsky created the sound and text for the exhibit.

Hwang is also founder, contributor, and curator of the Bushwick Book Club, a monthly performance series, about which The New Yorker writes: "Books inspire many things: movies, plays, religions, and even political platforms. Less frequently, they inspire songs (Kate Bush's 'Wuthering Heights,' Jefferson Airplane's 'White Rabbit'). For the past year, the Bushwick Book Club, which meets monthly, has addressed that deficiency by choosing a bill of songwriters to compose songs prompted by a chosen book, ranging from 'The Unbearable Lightness of Being' to 'The Origin of Species.'"

New York Press writes, "The widely varied events feature just about every imaginable genre, from folk and country to cabaret and drinking songs" and "the songs don’t seem to suffer from the frantic circumstances under which they are created. The songwriters who participate appreciate the structure the club imposes, and the book club has yielded some surprisingly complete compositions."

The Village Voice gave Bushwick Book Club the "Best of NYC" award for 2009, in the category of "Best Literary-Musical Crossover".
