= Heavy Covenant =

2021 single by the Hold Steady

Single by The Hold Steady
- Released: January 8, 2021
- Studio: The Clubhouse, Rhinebeck, New York City
- Genre: Rock
- Length: 4:39
- Label: Positive Jams; Thirty Tigers
- Songwriter(s): Craig Finn; Franz Nicolay
- Producer(s): Josh Kaufman

The Hold Steady singles chronology
"Family Farm" (2020)	"Heavy Covenant" (2021)

Audio video
- "Heavy Covenant" on YouTube

"Heavy Covenant" is a song by American indie rock band the Hold Steady. It was released on January 8, 2021, as the second single from their upcoming eighth studio album, Open Door Policy by Positive Jams and Thirty Tigers. The song was written by Craig Finn and Franz Nicolay, with Josh Kaufman handling production.

== Background and release ==
On December 1, 2020, the Hold Steady shared a new track "Family Farm" as the lead single from their upcoming eighth studio album,Open Door Policy, slated for release on February 19, 2021. "Heavy Covenant" was revealed as the sixth track on the record. On January 8, 2021, the song was released as the second single from the album.

== Composition ==
"Heavy Covenant" was written by the band members Craig Finn and Franz Nicolay, and produced by Josh Kaufman. It has been described a slow-building horn-laced rock track in press reviews. Building with bright synth flourishes, the song features guitars, drums and a driving percussion. Angie Martoccio of Rolling Stone also noted the use of a "buzzing" guitar riff. The song is four minutes and 39 seconds in length. Lyrically, "Heavy Covenant" discusses travel, technology, and human connection. Speaking about how the song was conceived, Craig Finn stated that it "came out of two different music pieces that THS piano/keyboardist Franz Nicolay brought in, and with the help of producer Josh Kaufman, we combined them." The horns were added in later to the chorus.

== Critical reception ==
Tom Breihan of Stereogum described "Heavy Covenant" as "a classic Hold Steady song" that "attaches musical exhilaration to a story of degradation." Polly Glass and Fraser Lewry of Classic Rock listed it as one of the best songs of its release week and wrote that the song "tips its hat to influences like Bruce Springsteen and Husker Du, while conjuring an organ-laced, storytelling depth of its own." BrooklynVegan also included the song on their playlist of favourite songs of the week. Beats Per Minute dubbed it as "a modern Hold Steady sound", lauding Finn's vocal performance and storytelling.

== Credits and personnel ==
Credits adapted from Tidal.

The Hold Steady

- Bobby Drake
- Craig Finn
- Tad Kubler
- Franz Nicolay
- Galen Polivka
- Steve Selvidge

Production

- Josh Kaufman – producer
