= The Price of Progress =

Studio album by the Hold Steady
- Released: March 31, 2023
- Recorded: 2021
- Studios: The Clubhouse, Rhinebeck, New York, United States; Future Sounds, Brooklyn, New York City, New York, United States; Spacebomb Studios, Richmond, Virginia, United States
- Genre: Indie rock
- Length: 38:47
- Labels: Positive Jams, Thirty Tigers
- Producer: Josh Kaufman

The Hold Steady chronology
Open Door Policy (2021)	The Price of Progress (2023)

The Price of Progress is the ninth studio album by the American indie rock band the Hold Steady, released on March 31, 2023, on Positive Jams and Thirty Tigers. The album was produced by Josh Kaufman, who had worked with the band on their previous two studio albums, Thrashing Thru the Passion (2019) and Open Door Policy (2021).

The album was preceded by the singles, "Sideways Skull", "Sixers" and "Understudies", and received generally positive reviews from critics.

== Writing and composition ==
Regarding the album's overall lyrical themes, vocalist Craig Finn noted: "I think the record in general has a lot to do with this late-stage capitalism. I was thinking a lot about how we survive, what we do for money, certainly inequalities and how social media and technology play into this." Finn elaborated, "I've been doing this podcast, That's How I Remember It, and I had George Saunders on, the writer. I thought in his newest book [2022's Liberation Day], the sort of late-stage capitalism backdrop had moved up a few steps. That's very much what I feel about this record. I think a lot of it is how the advances in technology have made us so efficient — as a society and in business and all that — that it's kind of left us reeling in a million different ways. That sort of adjustment is what we're going through now — the sensation of reeling. And that's where these characters find themselves. They're a little older than the ones I started my career writing about, and they're being affected in different ways."

The album's opening track, "Grand Junction", was partially inspired by Finn's experience of being stranded in Colorado during a family skiing trip: "I was in Colorado skiing, and I got in a blizzard, and I called the airline on a Sunday, and they said, 'We can get you out Wednesday.' I was like, 'Wait a minute — that’s three days from now,' so I got my dad, who I was with, to drive me out to Grand Junction, Colorado. I spent a night in a hotel there and flew out the next day. You’re basically up in the mountains there, so I spent 24 hours just kinda walking around Grand Junction. It felt destined to wind up in a song somewhere. Overall, the West is kind of interesting to me, and I think it shows up in this record — the idea that you might find some peace in these wide open spaces, but you usually end up bringing your own problems with you." The song specifically details a fictional relationship "about a couple that's driving out West. But the couple [is] fighting, because the woman, she's got an Amazon wishlist, and strange dudes she talks to online are sending her presents, and the dude — her partner — is not that into it, so they're fighting about that. So, you know, I did drive through Grand Junction, Colorado, and I thought that'd be a good place for a song, but then I made up the rest. I was thinking about people who ask for presents on Amazon, and how that's sort of a modern thing that didn't exist 10, 15, 20 years ago."

The album's closing track, "Flyover Halftime", tells the story of a pitch invasion, with Finn noting: "My friend mentioned that the Premier League was having a problem with pitch invasions, that some of these matches had several each game. They won’t put the camera on them to encourage them. I got to thinking about that story. It’s the idea of this guy not having a great time all week: His truck is in the shop, and he paid more than he can afford for the tickets, and he drank too much in the parking lot, and he’s been looking forward to this game all week, and the ref makes a bad call. And it’s like, 'The only thing I can do to salvage this is to jump on the field and get my friend to take a picture of it, and then I’m a legend.' With the emoji and the Instagram thing, [it’s touching on] the technology that’s a part of our everyday life and how these things all play into it. Funny enough, there’s more sports on this record than any other Hold Steady record."

== Recording ==
The Price of Progress was the band's third consecutive album to be produced by Josh Kaufman, following Thrashing Thru the Passion (2019) and Open Door Policy (2021). Vocalist and lyricist Craig Finn praised Kaufman's contributions to the band, stating: "I think he knows how to talk to everyone and get good performances out of everyone, and different people respond to different things. [...] It’s our ninth record, and I think one of the things he’s been able to do over the last two records is kind of find the spots for us. There’s a lot of people on the stage and in the studio, and when you all play at once, it doesn’t necessarily sound bigger. It’s about making the space and directing the traffic, putting different people in different corners sonically to make it sound as expansive as possible. I think that’s where these records have gotten to."

== Reception ==
Professional ratings
Aggregate scores
Source	Rating
AnyDecentMusic?	7.4/10 (10 reviews)
Metacritic	79/100 (12 reviews)
Review scores
Source	Rating
AllMusic	4/5 stars
Clash Music	6/10
The Line of Best Fit	8/10
Paste	7.910
Pitchfork	7.6/10
PopMatters	7/10
Slant Magazine	4/5 stars
Sputnikmusic	3.9/5
Under the Radar	7.5/10

Editors at AnyDecentMusic? rated this release a 7.4 out of 10, based on 10 reviews. The Price of Progress received positive reviews from critics noted at review aggregator Metacritic. It has a weighted average score of 79 out of 100, based on 12 reviews.

Editors at AllMusic rated this album 4 out of 5 stars, with critic Mark Deming writing that this album shares continuity with 2021's Open Door Policy as well as the band's signature "anthemic tunes married to dense, character-driven lyrics". Robin Murray of Clash Music complains that "anyone who has ever heard a Hold Steady song knows exactly what to expect from this record" and that the music "doesn’t catch fire at any point", summing it up as "a perfectly functional Hold Steady record, no more and no less" with a rating of 6 out of 10. Glide Magazine's Shawn Donohue writes that "each of these songs plays as musical flushed-out tales of joy, hope, and bleakness swirl together" and "the band is fully locked in as they deliver an evolved, cinematic offering of their barroom tales of relationship hardships around broken hearts calcified by more than recreational drug use". Writing for The Line of Best Fit, Simon Heavisides gave this release an 8 out of 10, describing the album as "cinematic" and praising vocalist Craig Finn's delivery and lyrics.

Editors at Paste chose this as one of the 10 best albums of the month, and critic Eric R. Danton called it "their most musically expansive effort" in his 7.9-out-of-10 review. Pitchfork's Stephen M. Deusner gave this release a 7.6 out of 10 for having "songs about desperation with no direction, alienation with no reconciliation, isolation in a crowded bar". At PopMatters, Chris Conaton rated The Price of Progress a 7 out of 10, calling it "a worthy addition to the Hold Steady’s now-hefty catalog". In Slant Magazine Jeremy Winograd gave this album 4 out of 5 stars and writes that this album "proves that they haven’t forgotten what made them great". Atari of Sputnikmusic rates this album a 3.9 out of 5, calling it "a joyous, no-frills rocker that reminds you why you fell in love with The Hold Steady in the first place", but also critiquing that "there are also several moments on The Price of Progress that don’t quite land". In Under the Radar, Hays Davis gives this album a 7.5 out of 10, writing "The Hold Steady is hardly a restrictive creative framework, while The Price of Progress reminds longtime fans why they continue to look forward to each album".

Editors at AllMusic included this on their list of favorite rock albums of 2023.

== Track listing ==
1. "Grand Junction" – 3:34
2. "Sideways Skull" – 4:04
3. "Carlos Is Crying" – 3:46
4. "Understudies" – 3:57
5. "Sixers" (Craig Finn) – 4:15
6. "The Birdwatchers" – 4:15
7. "City at Eleven" – 2:49
8. "Perdido" – 3:42
9. "Distortions of Faith" – 5:16
10. "Flyover Halftime" – 3:14

== Personnel ==
The Hold Steady

- Bobby Drake – drums
- Craig Finn – vocals
- Tad Kubler – lead guitar, backing vocals
- Galen Polivka – bass guitar
- Franz Nicolay – keyboards
- Steve Selvidge – rhythm guitar, backing vocals

Additional personnel

- Anna Bishop – violin
- Stuart Bogie – horn
- Jeff Citron – engineering
- Curtis Fye – engineering
- Dave Gardner – mastering at Infrasonic Sound, Angelino Heights, Los Angeles, California, United States
- Treesa Gold String – violin, conducting
- D. James Goodwin – engineer, mixing at The Isokon, Woodstock, New York, United States
- Peter Greydanus – cello
- Cassandra Jenkins – backing vocals
- Josh Kaufman – production
- Stacy Matthews – violin
- Jordan McLean – horn
- Shubham Mondal – assistant engineering
- Matt Moran – vibraphone
- Annie Nero – backing vocals
- Trey Pollard – conducting, string arrangement
- Quinn Price – violin
- Ellen Riccio – violin
- Kimberly Ryan – viola
- Molly Sharp – viola
- Alec Soth – photography
- Delaney Turner – violin
- Hyojoo Uh – viola
- Vance Wellenstein – design

== See also ==
- List of 2023 albums
