= The Virgin Digital Sessions =

EP by The Hold Steady
- Released: April 26, 2005
- Genre: alternative rock, indie rock
- Length: 11:34
- Label: frenchkiss records

The Hold Steady chronology
Almost Killed Me (2004)	The Virgin Digital Sessions (2005)	Separation Sunday (2005)

The Virgin Digital Sessions was an internet-only EP release from the Hold Steady in early 2005. Versions of the album were distributed in the MP3 format by Amazon.com and SpiralFrog, among other online retailers. Alternate mixes of the first three tracks subsequently appeared in the Separation Sunday LP, with the notable exception of "212 Margarita".

== Track listing ==
All songs were written by Craig Finn.

1. "Your Little Hoodrat Friend" – 3:52
2. "Don't Let Me Explode" – 2:29
3. "Crucifixion Cruise" – 1:32
4. "212 Margarita" – 3:42
