= Open Door Policy (album) =

Studio album by the Hold Steady
- Released: February 19, 2021
- Recorded: December 2019
- Studios: The Isokon, Woodstock, New York; The Clubhouse, Rhinebeck, New York
- Genre: Rock
- Length: 40:30
- Label: Positive Jams
- Producer: Josh Kaufman

The Hold Steady chronology
Thrashing Thru the Passion (2019)	Open Door Policy (2021)	The Price of Progress (2023)

Open Door Policy is the eighth studio album by the American rock band the Hold Steady, released on February 19, 2021, through the band's own label Positive Jams. The album was produced by Josh Kaufman, who had previously worked with the band on their seventh studio album, Thrashing Thru the Passion (2019), and was preceded by the singles "Family Farm", "Heavy Covenant" and "Spices".

Released to critical acclaim, the album debuted at number 6 on Billboard's Top Album Sales chart and number 48 on their Top Rock Albums chart. At the end of 2021, the album received accolades from AllMusic, Uncut, Double J and God is in the TV, appearing on their end-of-year lists.

== Background ==
The album was recorded in December 2019 at the Clubhouse Studio and The Isokon Studio in New York, with producer Josh Kaufman. Lead vocalist Craig Finn said in a press release: "Open Door Policy was very much approached as an album vs. a collection of individual songs, and it feels like our most musically expansive record. This album was written and almost entirely recorded before the pandemic started, but the songs and stories explore power, wealth, mental health, technology, capitalism, consumerism, and survival – issues which have compounded in 2020."

Musicians Stuart Bogie, Jordan McLean, Cassandra Jenkins, Annie Nero and The Walkmen's Matt Barrick appear on the album.

== Release ==
On December 1, 2020, the Hold Steady announced they were releasing their eighth studio album. The album's first single, "Family Farm" was released that same day.

On January 8, 2021, the Hold Steady release the second single "Heavy Covenant". The band explained the single "is a song about travel, technology, and human connection. The song came out of two different music pieces that THS piano/keyboardist Franz Nicolay brought in, and with the help of producer Josh Kaufman, we combined them. It came together quickly, and when our friends Stuart and Jordan came in and added the horns to the chorus it really seemed to bring it together. To us, this song is a great indication of where the band’s sound is at in 2021."

== Critical reception ==
Professional ratings
Aggregate scores
Source	Rating
AnyDecentMusic?	7.6/10
Metacritic	78/100
Review scores
Source	Rating
AllMusic	4/5 stars
American Songwriter	4/5 stars
Beats Per Minute	76%
Clash	8/10
DIY	3.5/5 stars
Exclaim!	8/10
MusicOMH	4/5 stars
Paste	8.1/10
Pitchfork	7.6/10
PopMatters	6/10

Open Door Policy was met with "generally favorable" reviews from critics. At Metacritic, which assigns a weighted average rating out of 100 to reviews from mainstream publications, this release received an average score of 78 based on 20 reviews. AnyDecentMusic? gave the release a 7.6 out of 10 based on a critical consensus of 20 reviews.

In a review for Pitchfork, Daniel Felsenthal wrote: "Their rejuvenated second act continues with Open Door Policy, an ornate record that incorporates Nicolay’s ambitious compositions as an integral part of the band’s songwriting. Passion had them recognizing, to quote a lyric, 'It doesn’t have to be perfect/Just sort of has to be worth it.' On Open Door Policy, they reach for something larger: if not perfection, then music with a baroqueness we haven’t quite heard from them before....Big moments appear in surprising places on Open Door Policy." In a review for AllMusic, Stephen Thomas Erlewine wrote: "Written and recorded as a cohesive album, Open Door Policy feels like the Cinemascope cousin to Thrashing Thru the Passion: the Hold Steady take full advantage of their larger canvass. Finn's words deserve concentration, but the key to Open Door Policy is how it plays as an operatic rock & roll record, where the emphasis lies more on the melodrama than the grit. Perhaps this slowing pace is the inevitable side effect of middle age." Lee Zimmerman of American Songwriter wrote: "Expressed from a first person point of view, the music comes across with a sense of unease, urgency and uncertainty, which, in turn, boosts both interest and intrigue. Clearly, The Hold Steady are intent on burrowing below the surface in their pursuit of principle and propriety." Tim Sentz of Beats Per Minute praised lead vocalist Craig Finn's vocals, noting: "Finn’s vocals are less nasally slurred, and lyrically he’s telling a slightly grander story instead of just writing individual songs." Jamie Wilde of Clash explained: "The album’s upbeat energy is feverish. It allows space for comical and witty intervention among its deeper subjects. This record exposes a band who, after almost two decades in the game, are still enjoying what they’re doing and their close-knit chemistry befits their band name. Finn's lyrical observations once more take centre stage in Open Door Policy. Producer Josh Kauffman's vocal mix is throat grabbing as Finn’s Beat style delivery flows like Kerouac or Ginsberg."

Writing for Exclaim!, Oliver Crook gave the album an eight out of 10, explaining "Open Door Policy carries all the trademarks of a Hold Steady record: Craig Finn's distinctive vocals are supported by an effortlessly distorted sound that is equally as complex. Finn's lyrics are scattered with shady characters and messed-up souls, but there's more of an edge on Open Door Policy. Recorded in 2019, its themes of mental health, income inequality and isolation feels all the more relevant today."

=== Accolades ===
Open Door Policy on year-end lists
Publication	List	Rank	Ref.
AllMusic	AllMusic's Best of 2021	N/A	
Double J	The 50 Best albums of 2021	25	
God is in the TV	Albums of the Year 2021	9	
Uncut	Uncut's 75 Best Albums of 2021	32	

== Track listing ==
Open Door Policy track listing
No.	Title	Music	Length
1.	"The Feelers"	Craig Finn; Franz Nicolay	4:45
2.	"Spices"	Finn; Tad Kubler	3:45
3.	"Lanyards"	Finn; Kubler	3:54
4.	"Family Farm"	Finn; Nicolay; Kubler	3:42
5.	"Unpleasant Breakfast"	Finn; Kubler	4:59
6.	"Heavy Covenant"	Finn; Nicolay	4:39
7.	"The Prior Procedure"	Finn; Steve Selvidge	3:38
8.	"Riptown"	Finn; Selvidge; Kubler	3:22
9.	"Me & Magdalena"	Finn; Nicolay	3:48
10.	"Hanover Camera"	Finn; Nicolay	3:58
11.	"Parade Days" (Bonus track)	Finn; Selvidge	3:16

== Charts ==
Chart performance for Open Door Policy
Chart (2021)	Peak position
Scottish Albums (Official Charts)	9
UK Independent Albums (Official Charts)	7
US Top Rock Albums (Billboard)	48
US Top Album Sales (Billboard)	6
US Indie Store Album Sales (Billboard)	5
