= Center for the Arts =

The Center for the Arts is the name of many venues, including:

India
Indira Gandhi National Centre for the Arts, New Delhi, India

United States
Cantor Arts Center (Iris & B. Gerald Cantor Center for Visual Arts at Stanford University), Stanford, California
Hopkins Center for the Arts, Hanover, New Hampshire
Interlochen Center for the Arts, Interlochen, Michigan
John F. Kennedy Center for the Performing Arts, Washington, D. C.
Lincoln Center for the Performing Arts, New York City, New York
Montalvo Arts Center, Saratoga, California
Overture Center for the Arts, Madison, Wisconsin
Segerstrom Center for the Arts, Costa Mesa, California
Wexner Center for the Arts, Columbus, Ohio
