= Moveable feast (disambiguation) =

A moveable feast is any annual religious observance (Easter is a well-known example) whose calendar date varies from year to year.

Moveable (or movable) feast, and other variants, may refer to:

- Moveable Feast (organization), Baltimore-based HIV/AIDS program

== Titled works ==
- A Moveable Feast, memoir of Ernest Hemingway
- "Moveable Feast" (2001), (double) episode of the US television program Will & Grace

=== Music ===
- A Moveable Feast, US edition of 1974 album Fairport Live Convention
- "Moveable Feast" (1978), track by Henry Mancini on soundtrack album Who Is Killing the Great Chefs of Europe?
- A Moveable Feast (2007), album by The Sharp Things
