= Live at Fingerprints =

EP by The Hold Steady
- Released: April 17, 2007
- Recorded: October 15, 2006
- Genre: alternative rock, indie rock
- Length: 18:00
- Label: Vagrant
- Producer: Morgan Lowry

The Hold Steady chronology
| Boys and Girls in America (2006) | Live at Fingerprints (2007) | Stay Positive (2008) |

Professional ratings
Review scores
| Source | Rating |
|---|---|
| Pitchfork Media | (7.5/10) link |

Live at Fingerprints is an EP of acoustic music performed live by the Hold Steady on October 15, 2006 at the Fingerprints record shop in Long Beach, CA. The release was limited to 5000 copies distributed by Junketboy to independent record shops throughout the United States. The album features acoustic versions of three songs featured in Hold Steady's 2006 Boys and Girls in America album, including "Chips Ahoy", "You Can Make Him Like You" and "Citrus".

== Track listing ==
All tracks written by Craig Finn.

1. "Cattle and the Creeping Things" – 4:19
2. "Chips Ahoy!" – 4:50
3. "You Can Make Him Like You" – 3:00
4. "Citrus" – 3:57
5. "You Gotta Dance with Who You Came to the Dance With" – 2:44
