= Anti-Social Music =

- Also known as: ASM
- Origin: New York, New York, United States
- Years active: 2001–present
- Website: www.antisocialmusic.org

Anti-Social Music (ASM) is a composer/performer collective founded in New York City in 2001. The group started as a one-off concert organized by Franz Nicolay of world premieres of works by William Brittelle, Jason Freeman, Dan Lasaga, Franz Nicolay, and John Wriggle at Columbia University's Philosophy Hall on March 25, 2001.

ASM performs two concerts of all world premieres annually. World Premieres Shows have been held in various New York venues including the Pantheon Theater, The Flea Theater, CAMI Hall, Greenwich House Music School, Merkin Hall, and La Tea and are noted for their informality and tongue-in-cheek attitude.

ASM's first recording, ASM Sings the Great American Songbook, was released on Peacock Recordings and features world-premiere recordings of works by William Brittelle, Peter Hess, Andrea La Rose, Dan Lasaga, Pat Muchmore, Franz Nicolay, Ken Thomson, and John Wriggle and was funded by the Cary Trust. This recording was listed in Magnet magazine's "Top Ten Recordings You Didn't Hear" for 2005.

ASM produced the hit indie opera The Nitrate Hymnal, a multimedia one-hour work in four acts by writer Bob Massey and filmmaker David Wilson. The Nitrate Hymnal had its world premiere at the Masonic National Memorial in Alexandria, Virginia on January 23, 2003. The performance featured a hybrid orchestra of post-punk and classically trained musicians, and told the story of a couple who obsessively filmed their lives. In 2005, ASM partnered with Bob Massey and The Gena Rowlands Band to re-orchestrate and record songs from The Nitrate Hymnal, which was released on Lujo Records in 2006 and funded by the Copland Fund for Recording.

Inspired by the success of The Nitrate Hymnal, ASM has partnered with innovative composers working outside the classical and jazz traditions in a new DIY commissioning program called ASM Sleeps Around. The first partnership was with experimental hip-hop group Dälek; the second was with Warn Defever from His Name Is Alive.

ASM's fourth studio recording, ...is the Future of Everything, was released by Peacock Recordings in April 2011.

== Members ==
ASM's principal members include:

- William Brittelle (The Blondes)
- Hubert Chen
- Jean Cook (Waco Brothers, Ida, Beauty Pill, Jon Langford, Gena Rowlands Band)
- David Durst (Poor But Sexy, The Gena Rowlands Band)
- Joe Exley (Tubajoe)
- Peter Hess (Balkan Beat Box, The World/Inferno Friendship Society)
- Bradley Kemp
- Andrea La Rose
- Dan Lasaga
- Pat Muchmore
- Franz Nicolay (The Hold Steady, World/Inferno Friendship Society, Guignol)
- Kamala Sankaram
- Maria Sonevytsky (Main Squeeze Orchestra, The Debutante Hour)
- Ken Thomson (Gutbucket, World/Inferno Friendship Society)
- John Wriggle (Swing Repair, Ex Caminos)

== Discography ==
- Anti-Social Music Sings the Great American Songbook (Peacock 007)
- Anti-Social Music + Gena Rowlands Band: The Nitrate Hymnal (Lujo Records 038)
- Fracture: The Music of Pat Muchmore (Innova Recordings 760)
- Anti-Social Music is the Future of Everything (Peacock 015)
