= Thrashing Thru the Passion =

Studio album by the Hold Steady
- Released: August 16, 2019
- Studio: The Isokon, Woodstock, New York; Brooklyn Recording, Brooklyn, New York City
- Genre: Indie rock; alternative rock; heartland rock
- Length: 35:34
- Label: Frenchkiss
- Producer: Josh Kaufman

The Hold Steady chronology
Teeth Dreams (2014)	Thrashing Thru the Passion (2019)	Open Door Policy (2021)

Thrashing Thru the Passion is the seventh studio album by American indie rock band the Hold Steady, released on August 16, 2019, on Frenchkiss Records. Produced by Josh Kaufman, the album sees the return to the line-up of keyboardist Franz Nicolay, who had left the group after 2008's Stay Positive.

== Critical reception ==
Professional ratings
Aggregate scores
Source	Rating
AnyDecentMusic?	7.1/10
Metacritic	75/100
Review scores
Source	Rating
AllMusic	4/5 stars
The A.V. Club	B+
Exclaim!	8/10
The Guardian	4/5 stars
Mojo	3/5 stars
NME	4/5 stars
Pitchfork	8.0/10
Q	2/5 stars
Rolling Stone	3.5/5 stars
Under the Radar	6.5/10

Reviews of the album were generally positive, feeling that the album was something of a return to form for the band. Jonathan Bernstein of Rolling Stone stated that the group had abandoned "the self-seriousness that has sometimes bogged down their recent work, and the result is a shockingly fun return-to-form collection of sad-sack storytelling". Evan Rytlewski of Pitchfork wrote that "despite coming from a band that seems to be winding down in many ways, Thrashing Thru The Passion is so alive and elated that, if not for Hold Steady's well-documented track record, it could be mistaken for the work of a band just hitting its peak. It's as joyous and rousing as the band's best efforts, but also looser and utterly unforced." Jesse Hassenger of The A.V. Club said "with an expanded lineup, this new configuration is a looser and less-anthemic iteration of the band, reducing the fist-pumping and giving the songs more room to breathe" and felt that the album "feels liberated from some of the band’s usual album architecture... It’s a productive scaling-down – the sound of a great rock band getting back to work". Adam Feibel of Exclaim! said "Thrashing Thru the Passion might be the most fun and carefree Hold Steady record". James McMahon of NME stated that the return of Nicolay had improved the band, and that "the Hold Steady achieve their best work when their playing is loose... When they sound like the best bar band in the best bar you didn't know about until you found yourself in it at 3am in the morning."

== Track listing ==
1. "Denver Haircut" – 3:01
2. "Epaulets" – 2:47
3. "You Did Good Kid" – 4:09
4. "Traditional Village" – 2:48
5. "Blackout Sam" – 4:52
6. "Entitlement Crew" – 3:45
7. "T-Shirt Tux" – 3:58
8. "Star 18" – 3:13
9. "The Stove & the Toaster" – 3:33
10. "Confusion in the Marketplace" – 3:28

== Personnel ==
The Hold Steady

- Bobby Drake
- Craig Finn
- Tad Kubler
- Franz Nicolay
- Galen Polivka
- Steve Selvidge

Production

- Josh Kaufman – producer

== Charts ==
Chart (2019)	Peak position
Scottish Albums (OCC)	30
UK Independent Albums (OCC)	13
US Independent Albums (Billboard)	9
