= Overture Center for the Arts =

Wisconsin performing arts center and art gallery

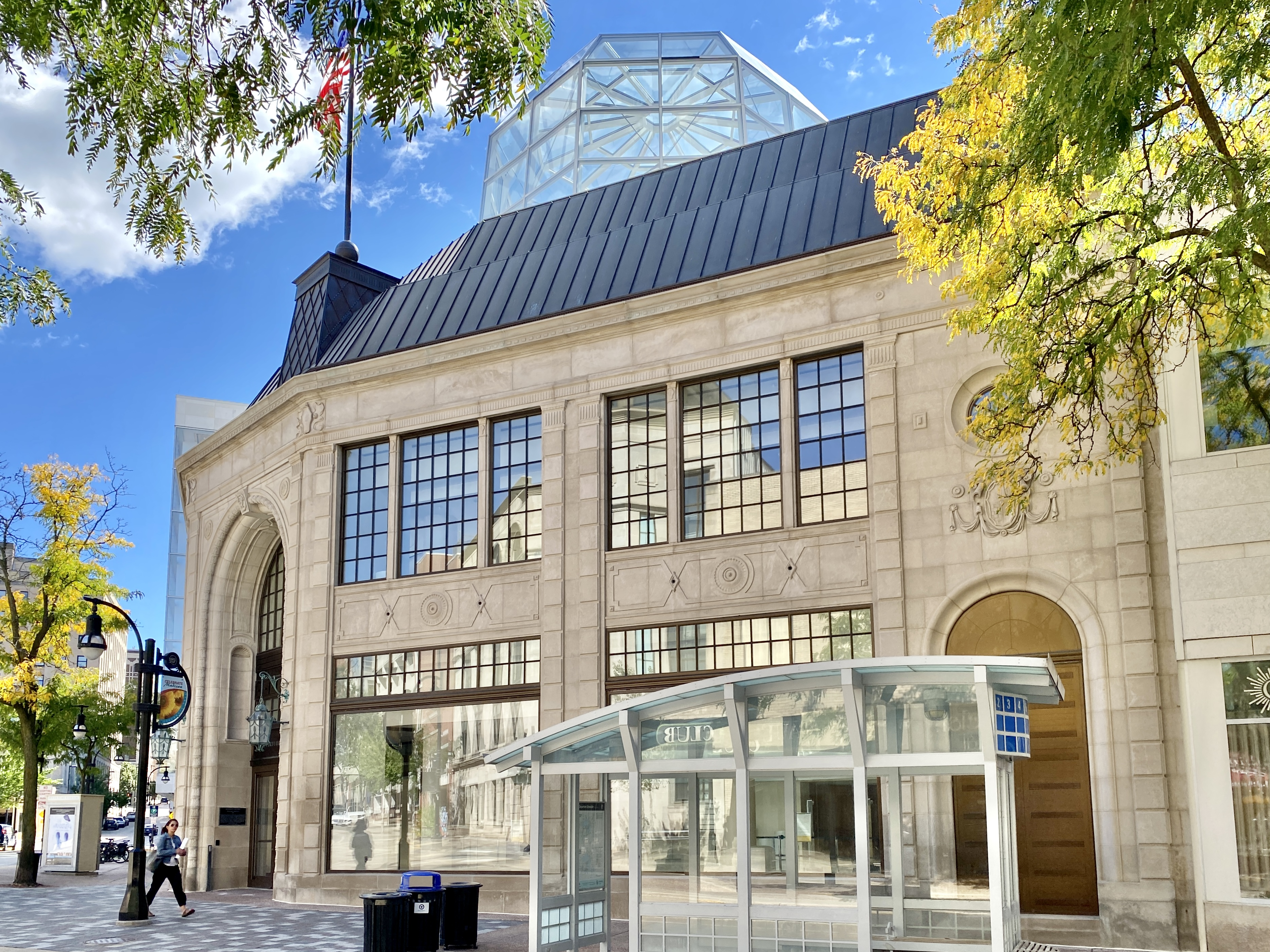
- The Overture Center in 2022
- Interactive map of Overture Center for the Arts
- Address: 201 State Street; Madison, Wisconsin; United States
- Coordinates: 43°4′28″N 89°23′19″W
- Operator: Overture Center Foundation
- Capacity: Overture Hall: 2,255; Capitol Theater: 1,089; The Playhouse: 347; Promenade Hall: 252; Rotunda Stage: 350
- Type: performing arts center
- Public transit: Metro Transit

Construction
- Opened: 1928 (Capitol Theatre)
- Reopened: 1980 (Madison Civic Center); 2004 (Overture Center for the Arts)
- Architect: Cesar Pelli

Website
- overture.org

Overture Center for the Arts is a performing arts center and art gallery in Madison, Wisconsin, United States. The center opened on September 19, 2004, replacing the former Civic Center. In addition to several theaters, the center also houses the Madison Museum of Contemporary Art.

== History ==
The center was commissioned by Jerome "Jerry" Frautschi and Pleasant Rowland, founder of American Girl. The entire building costs were covered by multiple gifts totaling $205 million from Fraustchi and Rowland. It was designed by architect César Pelli, whose notable projects include the Petronas Towers in Kuala Lumpur and the Salesforce Tower in San Francisco.

The Overture Center for the Arts building replaced the Madison Civic Center, which was located on the same block on State Street. Since opening in 2004, the Overture Center has had five Presidents and CEOs. Bob D'Angelo, the first President and CEO, resigned in 2005 following an Overture Center employee's allegations of sexual harassment. Following his resignation, D'Angelo served 10 months of a one-year prison term for tax evasion and misusing his city office. More recent Presidents and CEOs of the Overture Center include Michael Goldberg, Tom Carto, Ted DeDee and Sandra Gajic.

After Frautschi and Rowland's initial gift of $100 million, the philanthropists donated another $100 million to ensure it would be a "state-of-the-art" venue. Some citizens complained that the city's priorities were skewed, with some critics arguing the project would hurt the image of nearby State Street and others believing the cultural center would only be accessible to the wealthy while limiting access to local and smaller acts and artists.

After the initial construction of the center, concerns were raised over additional funding. Citizens became concerned that Overture's reserve funds would decrease and during the Great Recession, the potential was raised for the city to step in to maintain funding levels. These fears were exacerbated by the liquidation of the trust fund that was set up to pay the construction debt for the building as well as provide some operating income. The liquidation left some construction debt that was paid for by Frautschi, Rowland, and others, and forced the center to cut staff. The Overture Center emerged from its financial difficulty by 2013.

=== 2019 Miss Saigon controversy ===
In 2014, the Overture Center launched its Racial Equity Initiative following the release of the Race to Equity Report, which highlighted significant racial disparities in Dane County. As part of this initiative, Ed Holmes was hired as the center's first director of diversity and inclusion in 2016, aiming to address racial inequities in the community through the arts.

In April 2019, the Overture Center scheduled a production of Miss Saigon, sparking controversy within the Asian American community. Critics, including scholar Timothy Yu, argued that the musical perpetuated harmful stereotypes of Asian women, depicting them as either hypersexualized figures or passive victims. In response to public outcry, the Overture Center organized a panel discussion titled "Asian American Perspectives on Miss Saigon," which sought to explore the portrayal of Asian Americans in media. However, the event faced multiple changes, including the replacement of a key panelist and the removal of critical materials, leading to further tensions. Sandra Gajic, president of the Overture Center, argued that the tone was "adversarial... blaming Overture and me personally for having Miss Saigon in our season put us in an unfair position." She continued: "Vietnamese, Asians — many of them love the show."

On the morning of the planned event, the panel was delayed indefinitely by the Overture Center, citing concerns over its tone and potential conflict. In protest, the Asian American panelists held a teach-in outside the venue. The cancellation and the handling of the event led to public apologies from Gajic, who acknowledged the mistakes and vowed to reassess the center's approach to programming and dialogue in the future.

The controversy continued to unfold when Edgewood College canceled a planned trip to the Miss Saigon production, citing the show's portrayal of the Vietnam War and its reinforcement of negative stereotypes.

== Venues ==
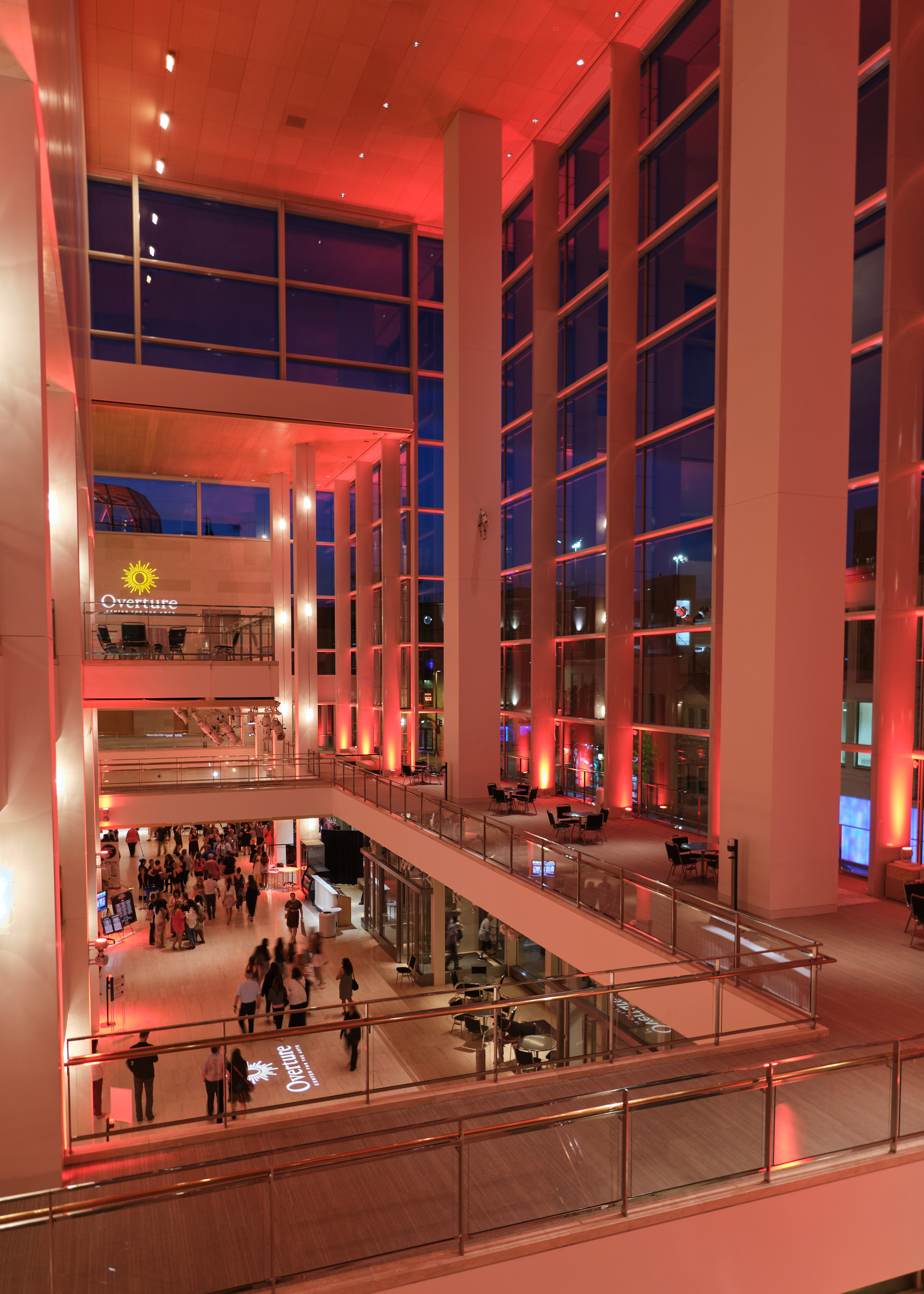
Overture Center atrium

The 2,251-seat Overture Hall is the cultural center's largest theater. Consisting of four levels of seats, it has a striking architectural style and was designed for acoustics (no center aisle). The balconies have "continental-style" seating arrangements, where aisles other than those on the sides of seat rows are omitted in order to provide greater seat size and acoustics. It houses the Pleasant Rowland Concert Organ, a large, custom-built organ, by the German organ builder Orgelbau Klais. This theater hosts the Madison Symphony Orchestra, Madison Opera, and Madison Ballet.

During Overture construction, the Oscar Mayer Theater (originally the 1928 Capitol Theater and movie palace) was restored, downsized, and re-christened the Capitol Theater. The theater's inaugural performance, Wisconsin Chamber Orchestra, upon reopening took place in November 2005. The theater seats up to 1089 people on the main floor and balcony. The theater features an organ built by Oshkosh's Barton Organ Company. Resident companies include the Wisconsin Chamber Orchestra and CTM Madison Family Theatre, including regular performances from traveling shows and concerts.

The Playhouse is a smaller, intimate performance space that replaced the former Isthmus Playhouse. It was renovated with the Madison Repertory Theatre in mind as its resident company and was occupied by Madison Rep until its closure in March 2009. Forward Theater Company is now its resident company.

Other smaller venues include Promenade Hall, Rotunda Stage, Wisconsin Studio and Rotunda Studio. The center contains four visual art galleries. The Overture Galleries present exhibits by local and state artists and organizations. The center houses the James Watrous Gallery, which is operated by the Wisconsin Academy of Sciences, Arts, and Letters.

== Notable performers ==
Following is a partial list of notable performers that have staged concerts at the Capitol Theater and Overture Center:

- Dream Theater
- Bryan Adams
- Alabama Shakes
- Tori Amos
- Laurie Anderson
- Criss Angel
- Joan Baez
- The Beach Boys
- Belle and Sebastian
- Tony Bennett
- Mike Birbiglia
- Andrew Bird
- Blue Man Group
- Blues Traveler
- Anthony Bourdain
- Jim Brickman
- Jackson Browne
- Mary Chapin Carpenter
- Johnny Cash
- June Carter Cash and the Carter Family
- Cheap Trick
- Chicago
- The Clancy Brothers
- John Cleese
- Jimmy Cliff
- Billy Cobham
- Perry Como
- Harry Connick Jr.
- Larry Coryell
- Alice Cooper
- Bill Cosby
- Elvis Costello
- Bo Diddley
- Ani DiFranco
- Bob Dylan
- Earth, Wind & Fire
- Susan Egan
- Michael Feinstein
- Fitz and the Tantrums
- Jane Fonda
- Peter Gabriel
- The Goo Goo Dolls
- Kathy Griffin
- Buddy Guy
- Sammy Hagar
- Merle Haggard
- Hall & Oates
- Corey Hart
- Mayer Hawthorne
- Indigo Girls
- Robert Irvine
- Chris Isaak
- Joe Jackson
- Al Jarreau
- Jars of Clay
- Jethro Tull
- Meg Johnson
- Norah Jones
- Garrison Keillor
- B.B. King
- Gladys Knight
- Diana Krall
- Patti LaBelle
- Ladysmith Black Mambazo
- k.d. lang
- Jonny Lang
- Legion of Mary
- John Leguizamo
- Ramsey Lewis
- Gordon Lightfoot
- Little Big Town
- Lisa Loeb
- Kenny Loggins
- Lyle Lovett
- Patti LuPone
- Yo-Yo Ma
- Taj Mahal
- Bill Maher
- Mannheim Steamroller
- Branford Marsalis
- Wynton Marsalis
- Steve Martin
- Matisyahu
- Kathy Mattea
- John Mayall & the Bluesbreakers
- Idina Menzel
- Natalie Merchant
- Ingrid Michaelson
- Liza Minnelli
- Colin Mochrie and Brad Sherwood
- Mormon Tabernacle Choir
- Graham Nash
- Willie Nelson
- Bob Newhart
- Ted Nugent
- Gary Numan
- Laura Nyro
- Karen Olivo
- Bonnie Owens
- Ken Page
- Christopher Parkening
- Dolly Parton
- Carl Perkins
- Itzhak Perlman
- Bernadette Peters
- The Police
- Portugal. The Man
- John Prine
- Bonnie Raitt
- Lou Reed
- Return to Forever
- The Righteous Brothers
- Molly Ringwald
- Joan Rivers
- Diana Ross
- David Sanborn
- The Searchers
- David Sedaris
- Jerry Seinfeld
- Shinedown
- Martin Short
- Yakov Smirnoff
- Mavis Staples
- The Statler Brothers
- Straight No Chaser
- String Driven Thing
- Styx
- John Tartaglia
- The Temptations
- Thompson Twins
- George Thorogood & the Destroyers
- Toad the Wet Sprocket
- Lily Tomlin
- Peter Tosh
- Tower of Power
- Brandon Uranowitz
- Michal Urbaniak
- Anna Vogelzang
- Muddy Waters
- Doc Watson
- Weather Report
- Lawrence Welk
- Ron White
- Roger Whittaker
- Wilco
- Hank Williams Jr.
- George Winston
- XTC
- Weird Al Yankovic
- Yanni
- Peter Yarrow and Noel Paul Stookey
- Steve Young
- ZZ Top
- Warren Zevon

== See also ==
- List of concert halls
