= The Sharp Things =

- Origin: Brooklyn, New York, United States
- Genres: Pop, Rock, Soul
- Years active: 1995–present
- Labels: Dive Records, Bar/None Records, Ropeadope Records
- Members: Perry Serpa; Jim Santo; Aisha Cohen; Michelle Caputo; Andrea Dovalle; James Pertusi
- Website: http://www.thesharpthings.com/

The Sharp Things is an American, New York City-based chamber pop collective, led by singer/songwriter Perry Serpa (born 1965). Current members include Jim Santo, Aisha Cohen, Michelle Caputo, James Pertusi, and Andrea Dovalle.

== Career ==
The band originated in the late 1990s as a recording project of Serpa and drummer Steve Gonzalez. The band's name was taken from the title of an unreleased demo tape, Here Come The Sharp Things, which in turn was taken from a lyric to a never-recorded song, the title of which is now forgotten. Guitarist Santo (formerly of Jenifer Convertible), joined in 1997 and the trio adopted The Sharp Things as its name for performances at small clubs on the Lower East Side of New York City.

The Sharp Things steadily added members over the next few years and began to broaden its musical palette with strings, horns, woodwinds, keyboards and other instruments. The group's first album, Here Comes The Sharp Things (an entirely different set of songs from the similarly entitled demo tape) was released in the United States in 2002 on Dive Records.

Comprising songs recorded by two different ensembles in 2000 and 2001, and largely produced by Serpa and Santo in the former's basement studio in Queens, New York, Here Comes The Sharp Things won critical acclaim for its lush, melancholy blend of British folk revival, classical music, jazz and 1970s radio pop influences. Favorable comparisons were drawn to a diverse list of artists, including Burt Bacharach, Brian Wilson, Nick Cave, Talk Talk, The Left Banke and Randy Newman. A cassette-only release appeared in 2003 on the Italian label Best Kept Secret, followed by a release in the United Kingdom on Setanta Records in the spring of 2004. In August of that year, the song "Demon Of Love" was released by Nettwerk on Public Display of Affection: The Sound of Independent Radio, a compilation of songs chosen by program directors from four of the most influential public radio stations in the United States; The Sharp Things were picked by Rita Houston of Fordham University station WFUV.

Foxes & Hounds was released in 2005 on Bar/None Records. In contrast to the lo-fi, homemade approach of the debut, the second album was entirely recorded and mixed in professional recording studios in New York City. Foxes & Hounds also marked the emergence of The Sharp Things as a relatively stable line-up, and coincided with a stepped-up schedule of performances. R&B, blues, disco and rock influences manifested themselves in the songs on the album.

The Sharp Things began recording their third album on October 14, 2006. Entitled A Moveable Feast, the album features performances by The New York Symphonic Arts Ensemble. The 40-piece orchestra, conducted by Sybille Werner, was recorded on November 9, 2006, at the Julia Richman Education Complex in Manhattan. Other performers include Tony Award-winning actor and musician Michael Cerveris; Franz Nicolay, keyboardist for The Hold Steady; and tenor saxophonist Stuart D. Bogie of Antibalas.

Returning to the homemade approach of Here Comes A Sharp Things, A Moveable Feast was recorded in various kitchens, living rooms and basements around New York City by producer Billy "Prince Polo" Szeflinski. The album was mixed March 8–12, 2007, by Alex Lipsen at Headgear Recording in Williamsburg, Brooklyn. At the urging of Bar/None owner Glenn Morrow, an additional song, "Cruel Thing," was recorded April 26–27, 2007, at Truth & Soul, also in Williamsburg. Clay Wells Holley was recording engineer, and mixed the song with Szeflinski.

A Moveable Feast was released June 26, 2007 on Bar/None Records.

On September 28, 2009, The Sharp Things began recording what was to become a four-album series titled Dogs Of Bushwick. Again produced by Szeflinski, the recordings were primarily done at The Kennel Recording Studio in Bushwick, Brooklyn, a facility owned by Santo that closed in April 2014. Between July 23, 2010 and September 15, 2010, the band sponsored a Kickstarter fundraising drive that received more than $3,600 in pledges to fund the album's recording. A second campaign, on Indiegogo between February 1, 2014 and April 2, 2014, again raised more than $3,600. Further recording and mixing was done at Danbro Studios in Brooklyn and at Dubway Studios in Manhattan.

A free digital single, "It's Alright," originally recorded by Black Sabbath and written and sung by drummer Bill Ward, was released in November 2012 to promote the album series. The first album in the Dogs Of Bushwick series, Green Is Good, was released on February 26, 2013, on Dive Records. The second album in the series, The Truth Is Like The Sun, was released on November 26, 2013, also on Dive.

On September 26, 2013, The Sharp Things returned to the concert stage for the first time in three years, performing at Galapagos Art Space, located in the DUMBO section of Brooklyn. The performance was recorded by Jon D'Uva and released on March 20, 2014 as Live At Galapagos Art Space.

On July 17, 2014, Serpa announced on the band's Facebook page that the next album in the Dogs Of Bushwick series would be titled Adventurer's Inn. According to Serpa, the album was "named after a long dismantled amusement park where I spent many great days when I was child." The album was released December 2, 2014. A single from the album, "Love Me Indigo," received airplay on several Triple A radio stations in the United States, including WTMD, in Towson, Maryland, which hosted a live concert broadcast of The Sharp Things in February 2015.

Drummer and founding member Steve Gonzalez died September 11, 2014. He was 49. The band, which had been booked to perform that evening at Mercury Lounge in New York City, learned of his death shortly before taking the stage. The performance was recorded and distributed digitally by the New York City-based concert blogger NYC Taper.

Selected Songs 2002-2014, compiled from the band's discography to date, was released by Dive Records on December 25, 2014.

In 2015 the band began performing in smaller ensembles, often without a drummer. The group supported The Church on nine U.S. dates in March of that year, as a duo and quartet. In September, Serpa and Pertusi played two shows in England, opening for Caravan Of Thieves and The Polyphonic Spree; this resulted in The Sharp Things being invited to open for the Spree on five dates of their U.S. tour in November 2015.

EverybodyEverybody, the fourth and final album in the Dogs Of Bushwick series, was released February 19, 2016 on Ropeadope Records.

== Discography ==
- Here Comes The Sharp Things November 2002 (Dive)
- Here Comes The Sharp Things June 2003 (Best Kept Secret)
- Here Comes The Sharp Things May 2004 (Setanta)
- Public Display of Affection: The Sound of Independent Radio August 2004 (Nettwerk)
- Foxes & Hounds May 2005 (Bar/None)
- A Moveable Feast June 2007 (Bar/None)
- "It's Alright" (digital single) November 2012 (Dive)
- Green Is Good February 2013 (Dive)
- The Truth Is Like The Sun November 2013 (Dive)
- Live at Galapagos Art Space March 2014 (Dive)
- International Pop Overthrow, Vol. 17 October 2014 (Pop Geek Heaven)
- Adventurer's Inn December 2014 (Dive)
- Selected Songs 2002-2014 December 2014 (Dive)
- EverybodyEverybody February 2016 (Ropeadope)
