= The Bear and the Maiden Fair (song) =

Single by The Hold Steady

from the album Game of Thrones: Season 3
- Released: June 4, 2013
- Recorded: 2012–2013
- Genre: Television soundtrack
- Length: 2:56
- Label: WaterTower Music
- Composer: Ramin Djawadi
- Lyricist: George R. R. Martin
- Producer: Ramin Djawadi

Audio sample
- "The Bear and the Maiden Fair": file; help

"The Bear and the Maiden Fair" is a folk song in A Song of Ice and Fire novels, and it is sung in its television series adaptation Game of Thrones. The lyrics are provided by George R. R. Martin in the original novel; Ramin Djawadi composed the tune's music in 2012, at the request of the series creators David Benioff and D. B. Weiss, and the recording, by The Hold Steady, was arranged by Tad Kubler.

== History ==
The US indie rock band The Hold Steady recorded "The Bear and the Maiden Fair" for season 3. Brienne and Jaime's captors (who include musician Gary Lightbody from Snow Patrol, in a cameo appearance) sing the song in episode 3 of that season ("Walk of Punishment"), and The Hold Steady's recording is played over the end credits. The recording was released on a seven-inch record on April 20, 2013.

In the A Song of Ice and Fire novels, "The Bear and the Maiden Fair" is a traditional song popular among people of all social classes throughout Westeros. It recounts the story of a bear, "All black and brown / And covered with hair", who traveled to a summer fair, and smelled "on the summer air ... The maid with honey / In her hair!" Although she vowed that she'll "never dance / With a hairy bear", he "lifted her high / Into the air", and "licked the honey / From her hair", until she "sighed and squealed / And kicked the air", eventually agreeing to go off with her "bear so fair".

== Themes ==
Martin was the primary script writer on the Beauty and the Beast television series, and the Beauty and the Beast archetype shows frequently in his other works, among them A Song of Ice and Fire. Not only is the Bear and the Maiden Fair song frequently mentioned in the novels, but many characters and relationships throughout the novels embody its thematic elements. The three most prominent examples in the text are the duos of Daenerys Targaryen and Ser Jorah Mormont, Sansa Stark and Sandor Clegane, and Jaime Lannister and Brienne of Tarth. Both Daenerys and Sansa play the archetypical Beauty to Mormont's and Clegane's beasts, with House Mormont being represented by a black, hairy bear; and the knight in the text being stated often to physically resemble a bear. However, the cliche is slightly subverted in the narrative, since Daenerys does not desire Jorah Mormont romantically, and she even banishes him at one point in the story after she discovers his secret espionage. While the first two couples are straighter examples of the trope on paper, the latter couple is inverted with the genders reversed; with the beauty being the beautiful yet cruel man, and the beast is the ugly but noble woman.

== Credits ==
- The Hold Steady – band, primary artist
- Ramin Djawadi – composer, primary artist, producer
- David Benioff – liner notes
- George R.R. Martin – lyricist
- D.B. Weiss – liner notes
- Tad Kubler - arrangement

== See also ==
- Game of Thrones Theme
- Music of Game of Thrones
