= Ching Chong Song =

Ching Ching
- Origin: New York City
- Genres: Anti-folk, cabaret
- Years active: 2003–present
- Members: Julie LaMendola, Daniel Gower; Susan Hwang; Johnny Dydo; Jeff Larson; Sam Grossman; Simon Beins; Steffko
- Website: chingching.nfshost.com

"Jonquil" song
- 30-second sample: file; help

Ching Ching (previously known as Ching Chong Song) was a vocal duo rooted in New York City's Anti-folk scene. Their music is often experimental and off-kilter in nature, shifting from humorous to dark, serious, or thoughtful in tone, sometimes within the same song. Time Out New York wrote "Ching Chong Song is a genuine New York oddity, drawing equally from junior-high musicals and graphic performance art. LaMendola commands the stage with her nerves unhinged, one part rising diva, the other local loon."

LaMendola's approach to saw playing is to use it primarily as a melodic instrument, rather than a simple atmospheric effect, which is demonstrated in such songs as "Lynette" and "Jonquil". The prevalence of saw in their music was noted by the Village Voice when they wrote "Cabaret weirdos Ching Chong song has have a surprisingly large amount of singing saw in their tunes."

The group have released two full-length studio albums, Little Naked Gay Adventure and Everything is for the Babies, both produced by Kevin Blechdom. The latter album also features Susan Hwang, of The Debutante Hour, as a third member, playing accordion, janggu (a traditional Korean drum) and providing a third vocal harmony. While Hwang also appears with them in promo photos, and performs with them as schedules permit, they do still perform as a duo. Their extended musical family also includes Johnny Dydo, Jeff Larson, Sam Grossman, Simon Beins, and Steffko.

They have toured in the US and Europe, and performed at such diverse events as Art Basel, in Basel, Switzerland, Primavera a la Ciutat, in Barcelona, Spain, Ladyfest Rotterdam, in Rotterdam, Netherlands, and the Nachtbar Porn Festival in Berlin, Germany. They have also appeared on the NYC public access program Checkerboard Kids and were chosen to close the 22nd annual Antifolk Festival, hosted by Sidewalk Cafe owner and Anti-folk luminary, Lach. They were one of the groups listed as "Best Live Band in Town" in the New York Press 2009 Music Poll.

Time Out New York also described them as "An unconventional duo that plays regularly at Sidewalk Café. Their songs are spare, but the pair compensate with enough chutzpah to fill Carnegie Hall."

== Controversy ==
The group have been criticised for their name, which some feel is derogatory and insensitive to Asians, as "ching chong" is generally considered to be a racial slur. As such, the group has been the object of a student group protest on a few occasions (such as New York University) and had one other show cancelled by Bryn Mawr College where they were scheduled to play.

In a letter to the editor of Bryn Mawr's and Haverford's The Bi-College News Online regarding these incidents, LaMendola wrote of her disapproval of the cancellation of her group's show due to the band's name. This letter led to a spate of responses in the same Bryn Mawr publication.

These events occurred in 2007, and the group has performed without incident since that time. They briefly performed as Church of Lurch, then later went by the name Ching Ching.

In 2010, Ching Chong Song topped a Village Voice readers poll for "Worst Band Name in New York", beating out groups Wakey!Wakey!, Freelance Whales, and Food Stamps for this dubious honor.

The poll results were later lampooned by another NYC group, going by the moniker "Chink Floyd", citing their lack of inclusion in the poll.

A March 28, 2021, posting on the band's Facebook page addressed the band name controversy: "A band that toured widely in 2007-2014. We were ignorant of the way that the slang in our band name affected people of Asian descent. We apologize for whomever we hurt in our defense of using the term. We know we can't take back the pain we caused. Thank you for supporting our music. Please, gentle friends, support these groups as well." The post supplied links to resources addressing anti-Asian hatred.
