= Boys and Girls in America =

Studio album by the Hold Steady
- Released: October 3, 2006
- Studio: Water Music Recorders (Hoboken, New Jersey), Atomic Studios (Brooklyn, New York)
- Genre: Indie rock, rock
- Length: 40:07
- Label: Vagrant
- Producer: John Agnello

The Hold Steady chronology
Separation Sunday (2005)	Boys and Girls in America (2006)	Stay Positive (2008)

Boys and Girls in America is the third studio album by the Hold Steady, released on October 3, 2006 on Vagrant Records. The album was produced by John Agnello and preceded by the single, "Chips Ahoy!"

On August 18, 2006, first single "Chips Ahoy!" was released as a free download from music site Pitchfork Media. The second single, "Stuck Between Stations" began to appear on campus radio playlists in November 2006.

Backing vocals for the track "Chillout Tent" are provided by Soul Asylum's Dave Pirner and the Reputation's Elizabeth Elmore. Dana Kletter (ex-Blackgirls, Dear Enemy, and Hole's Live Through This) contributed backing vocals to "Chips Ahoy!", "You Can Make Him Like You", and "First Night".

The album title is a line taken from the opening lines of the song "Stuck Between Stations" ("There are nights when I think that Sal Paradise was right/Boys and girls in America have such a sad time together"), which in turn refers to a quote from American novelist and poet Jack Kerouac's 1957 novel On the Road and its narrator, Sal Paradise. The title is repeated in the lyrics in "First Night."

Boys and Girls in America has sold 94,000 albums as of April 2010.

== Recording ==
Boys and Girls in America was the first of two studio albums to be produced by John Agnello, who had previously worked with Dinosaur Jr., amongst others. Reflecting on working with Agnello, vocalist and lyricist Craig Finn noted: "John came in with a little more weight, if you will. One of the things that doesn’t really get talked about enough is that, in a sense, a producer is a leader — maybe that’s the biggest thing they are. I remember working with John, and he put up a calendar on the first day, saying, 'These are your days off. One of them is Mother’s Day — spend time with your mom.' He kinda laid it all out. Up until then, I’d always worked [with the approach of] 'What time do you guys want to start tomorrow?' [Now] there was this idea of 'We’re taking this seriously. This is a job.' That kind of leadership signaled something — it raised the game a little bit. I’m always thankful to him for doing that."

== Critical reception ==
Professional ratings
Aggregate scores
Source	Rating
Metacritic	85/100
Review scores
Source	Rating
AllMusic	4.5/5 stars
The A.V. Club	A−
Entertainment Weekly	A−
The Guardian	5/5 stars
The Irish Times	5/5 stars
MSN Music (Consumer Guide)	A−
NME	8/10
Pitchfork	9.4/10
Rolling Stone	3.5/5 stars
Spin	3.5/5 stars

The album received a metascore of 85 out of 100 on Metacritic, making it tied with four other albums for the 12th best-reviewed album of 2006. Magnet and The Onion's AV Club named it the best album of 2006.

Pitchfork rated Boys and Girls in America 9.4 out of 10, and named it the fifth-best album of the year. They later ranked it as the 64th best album of the decade.

Yahoo! Music ranked the album No. 9 on their list of the top 25 albums of 2006.

The song "Stuck Between Stations" was ranked No. 12 on Pitchfork's list of the top 100 songs of 2006 and No. 63 on the best of 2000's list.

"Chillout Tent" was ranked No. 33 in Rolling Stone's list of 100 best songs of 2006.

The song "Massive Nights" was always used at the Beginning of Colin Murray's Radio 1 Show, after the words, "New music, Alternative Classics, Drums" due to the drum roll introduction to the song.

== Other versions ==
The song "Girls Like Status" was featured on the album Aqua Teen Hunger Force Colon Movie Film for Theaters Colon the Soundtrack.

== Track listing ==
All songs written by Craig Finn, Tad Kubler and Franz Nicolay; except where noted.

1. "Stuck Between Stations" – 4:10
2. "Chips Ahoy!" – 3:09
3. "Hot Soft Light" – 3:53
4. "Same Kooks" (Finn, Kubler) – 2:47
5. "First Night" – 4:54
6. "Party Pit" (Finn, Nicolay) – 3:56
7. "You Can Make Him Like You" – 2:48
8. "Massive Nights" – 2:54
9. "Citrus" (Finn, Kubler) – 2:44
10. "Chillout Tent" – 3:42
11. "Southtown Girls" (Finn, Kubler) – 5:10

=== Bonus tracks on Japanese edition ===
12. "Against the Wind" (Bob Seger) – 5:17 (Bob Seger and the Silver Bullet Band cover)
13. "Stuck Between Stations" (Acoustic) – 4:13

=== Bonus tracks on Australian edition ===
12. "For Boston" – 3:17
13. "Girls Like Status" – 3:08
14. "Arms and Hearts" – 3:51
15. "American Music" (Gordon Gano) – 3:47 (Violent Femmes cover)

=== Bonus tracks on U.S. iTunes edition ===
12. "Girls Like Status" – 3:08
13. "Arms and Hearts" – 3:51

== Personnel ==
Adapted from the album liner notes.

=== The Hold Steady ===
- Craig Finn
- Tad Kubler
- Galen Polivka
- Franz Nicolay
- Bobby Drake

=== Additional musicians ===
- Jean Cook – violin
- Caleb Burhans – viola
- Peter Hess – tenor saxophone, horn arrangements
- Lloyd Debonis – trumpet
- Alan Ferber – trombone
- Drew Glackin – lap steel
- Dana Kletter – additional vocals
- Dave Pirner – vocals on "Chillout Tent"
- Elizabeth Elmore – vocals on "Chillout Tent"

=== Technical ===
- John Agnello – producer, engineer, mixing
- Ted Doherty – assistant engineer
- Chris DeCocco – assistant engineer
- Ted Young – mixing assistant
- Greg Calbi – mastering
- Steve Fallone – mastering assistant
- Marina Chavez – photography
- Ben Goetting – layout, design
- Sacha Penn – typography
