= Stay Positive (album) =

Studio album by the Hold Steady
- Released: 15 July 2008
- Genre: Indie rock; alternative rock; heartland rock
- Length: 43:48
- Label: Vagrant/Rough Trade
- Producer: John Agnello

The Hold Steady chronology
Boys and Girls in America (2006)	Stay Positive (2008)	Heaven Is Whenever (2010)

Professional ratings
Aggregate scores
Source	Rating
Metacritic	85/100
Review scores
Source	Rating
AllMusic	3/5 stars
The A.V. Club	B+
Entertainment Weekly	A
The Guardian	4/5 stars
Los Angeles Times	3.5/4 stars
MSN Music (Consumer Guide)	B+
NME	9/10
Pitchfork	8.4/10
Rolling Stone	4/5 stars
Spin	3/5 stars

Stay Positive is the fourth studio album by the Hold Steady, released on July 15, 2008, through Vagrant Records. Vocalist/guitarist Craig Finn notes that the album is about "the idea of ageing gracefully [...] keeping going, perseverance [and] how to stay true to the ideals and ideas you had when you were younger." Keyboard player Franz Nicolay notes that the album is his favorite, stating that it features an "integrated, nuanced, less hectic distillation of [their earlier] sound." Stay Positive was the last studio album to feature Nicolay for eleven years, until 2019's Thrashing Thru the Passion. Nicolay departed from the band in early 2010 but returned in 2016.

On May 20, the album's first single, "Sequestered in Memphis", was released on the band's MySpace page and on iTunes. On June 9, the entire album was made available to stream on MySpace, and on June 18 the full album became available on iTunes. It was later released for the videogame Rock Band (via the Rock Band Network) on March 4, 2010.

The record entered the UK Album Chart at #15 on July 20, 2008, the third-highest new entry. It ranked #1 on the UK Indie Chart. In the U.S. it entered at #30 on the Billboard 200. The album was Alex Zane's record of the week on the XFM breakfast show. The song "Constructive Summer" was number 56 on Rolling Stone's list of the 100 Best Songs of 2008.

Stay Positive has sold 88,000 copies as of April 2010

== Lyrical content ==
In an interview with Uncut, Craig Finn notes that he thought the album "should maybe look at the characters I’d been writing about on the previous three albums as they got a bit older, more adult with more adult problems." The title track in particular references several Hold Steady songs and characters from the previous albums, such as "Hornets! Hornets!", "Positive Jam", "Massive Nights" and "Sweet Payne", while relating them to the common theme of believing in the ideals of youth as you get older. The title track references hardcore punk bands Youth of Today, 7 Seconds, and Dillinger Four.

== Accolades ==
Publication	Country	Accolade	Year	Rank
The A.V. Club	USA	The Best Music of 2008	2008	#6
Q	UK	50 Best Albums of the Year	2008	#35
Mojo	UK	50 Best Albums of the Year	2008	#6
Uncut	UK	50 Best Albums of the Year	2008	#12
Rolling Stone	USA	50 Best Albums of the Year	2008	#36
Entertainment Weekly	USA	Best Music of 2008: A Second Opinion by Chris Willman	2008	#1

== Track listing ==
All songs written by Craig Finn and Tad Kubler, except where noted.

1. "Constructive Summer" – 2:56
2. "Sequestered in Memphis" – 3:33
3. "One for the Cutters" – 4:41
4. "Navy Sheets" – 3:23
5. "Lord, I'm Discouraged" – 5:08
6. "Yeah Sapphire" (Finn, Franz Nicolay) – 3:37
7. "Both Crosses" – 4:35
8. "Stay Positive" – 2:59
9. "Magazines" (Finn, Nicolay) – 3:09
10. "Joke About Jamaica" (Finn, Kubler, Nicolay) – 4:36
11. "Slapped Actress" – 5:19

=== CD bonus tracks ===
A "limited edition digipak" version of the album was released with three bonus tracks (however, they are uncut from one another and run continuous as track 12):

12. "Ask Her for Adderall" – 2:52
13. "Cheyenne Sunrise" – 4:11
14. "Two Handed Handshake" – 4:15

=== Vinyl edition ===
A double LP vinyl edition is also available, which includes the limited edition CD's bonus track "Ask Her for Adderall," as well as a slightly different track order.

Disc 1 Side A:

1. "Constructive Summer"
2. "Sequestered in Memphis"
3. "One For The Cutters"

Disc 1 Side B:

4. "Navy Sheets"
5. "Yeah Sapphire"
6. "Lord, I'm Discouraged"

Disc 2 Side A:

7. "Both Crosses"
8. "Stay Positive"
9. "Joke About Jamaica"

Disc 2 Side B:

10. "Ask Her For Adderall"
11. "Magazines"
12. "Slapped Actress"

=== Deluxe Edition ===
A deluxe edition, released on October 15, 2018, includes demo recordings of many of the original release's tracks as well as previously unreleased tracks: "This Isn't Enough", "You Tremble", and "The Ballad of the Midnight Hauler". "Spectres" and "40 Bucks" were previously released as downloadable bonus content from the live album A Positive Rage.

1. "Constructive Summer" – 2:56
2. "Sequestered in Memphis" - 03:32
3. "One For the Cutters" - 04:41
4. "Navy Sheets" - 03:21
5. "Lord, I'm Discouraged" - 05:08
6. "Yeah Sapphire" - 03:36
7. "Both Crosses" - 04:35
8. "Stay Positive" - 02:58
9. "Magazines" - 03:08
10. "Joke About Jamaica" - 04:35
11. "Slapped Actress" - 05:17
12. "Ask Her For Adderall" - 02:48
13. "Two Handed Handshake" - 04:13
14. "Cheyenne Sunrise" - 04:12
15. "Spectres" - 03:42
16. "40 Bucks" - 03:54
17. "This Isn't Enough" - 03:31
18. "You Tremble" - 02:19
19. "The Ballad of the Midnight Hauler" - 03:10
20. "Sequestered in Memphis (Demo)" - 02:46
21. "Yeah Sapphire (Demo)" - 03:57
22. "Stay Positive (Demo)" - 02:45
23. "Lord, I'm Discouraged (Demo)" - 05:14
24. "Magazines (Demo)" - 02:41
25. "Ask Her For Adderall (Demo)" - 02:44
26. "Two Handed Handshake (Demo)" - 05:04
27. "Joke About Jamaica (Demo)" - 05:31
28. "Creepy Harpsichord Jam (One for the Cutters) (Demo)" - 04:40
29. "40 Bucks (Demo)" - 03:58
30. "Phil Spector (Spectres) (Demo)" - 03:52
