= Anna Vogelzang =

American singer-songwriter

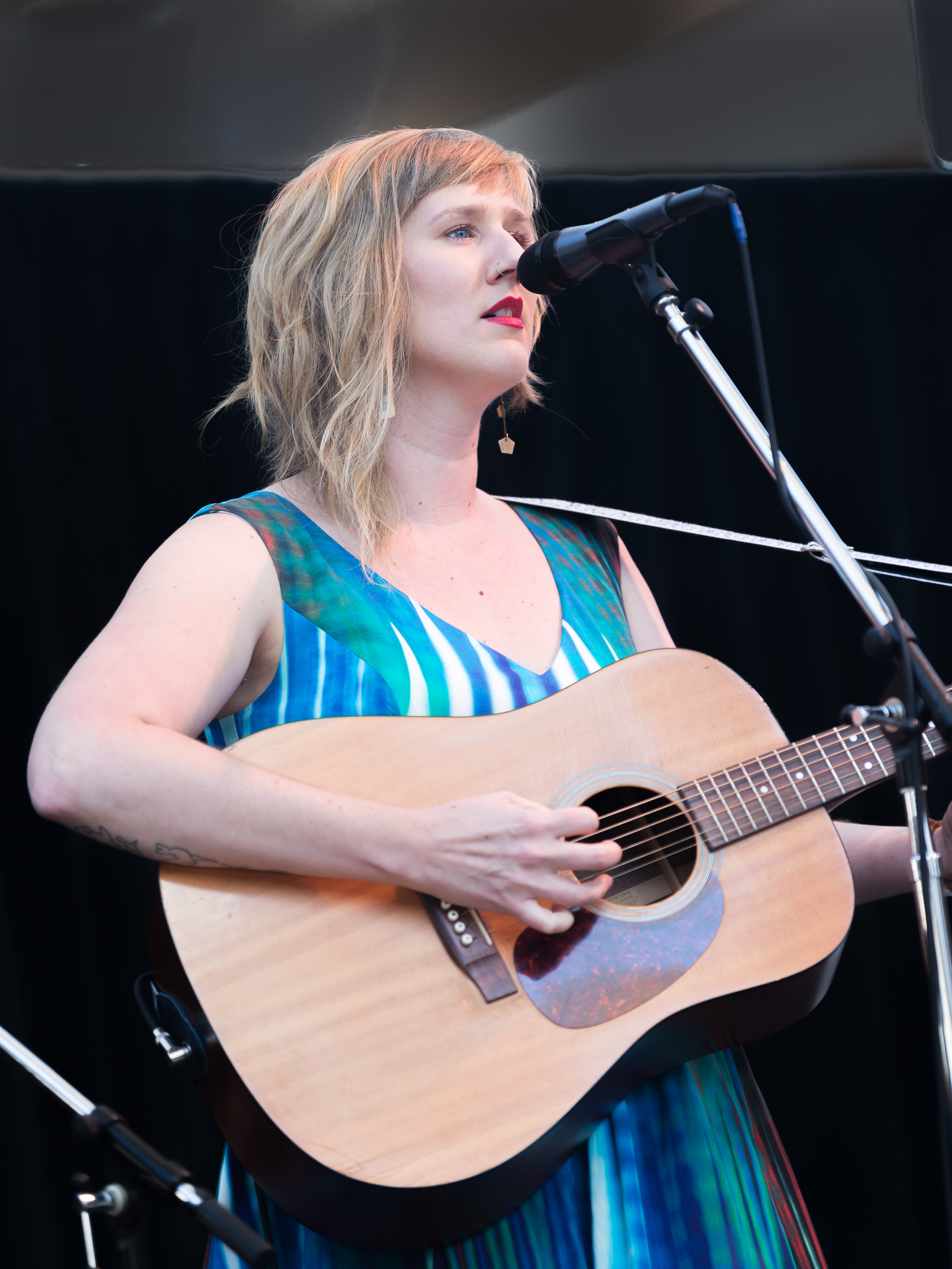
- Vogelzang performing at The Overture in 2014.

Background information
- Born: Lexington, MA, US
- Origin: Chicago, IL, US
- Genres: Folk, alternative folk, indie pop, americana, singer-songwriter
- Occupations: Vocalist, guitarist, musician, singer-songwriter, educator
- Instruments: Guitar, banjo, ukulele
- Years active: 2004–present

Anna Vogelzang (born 26 February 1985) is an American singer-songwriter and guitarist. Based in Chicago, she composes and performs on guitar, ukulele, baritone ukulele, banjo, and kalimba, and has been touring the United States since 2007.

== Career ==
In her early career, Vogelzang gained accolades at songwriting competitions, including the Falcon Ridge Folk Festival Emerging Artist Showcase, Telluride Troubadour Contest, Rocky Mountain Folks Festival Songwriter Showcase, and the National Women's Music Festival "Got Talent" Competition.

In 2014, Vogelzang appeared on Wisconsin Public Television's 30-Minute Music Hour and Wisconsin Public Radio's Simply Folk programs. Her work in the Madison, WI community included teaching at Girls Rock Camp Madison and founding the Wintersong Madison event, a holiday revue which raised over $10,000 for Second Harvest Foodbank of Southern Wisconsin in 2014. In 2015, Vogelzang recorded Hiker with producer Todd Sickafoose.

In 2016, Vogelzang moved from Madison, Wisconsin to Los Angeles, California. She is on the songwriting faculty at the Los Angeles College of Music. In 2017 Vogelzang and Adam Levy co-founded the NELA Song Salon, a songwriting workshop for fellow local musicians that later became a residency at the Bootleg Theater. Vogelzang recorded Beacon from 2017-2018 with co-producer Tyler Chester and musicians Adam Levy and Jay Bellerose, which later released in 2019.

Vogelzang has opened for Sara Bareilles, Gillian Welch, Mirah, Laura Gibson, Simone Felice, Anais Mitchell, Wye Oak, and has shared the stage multiple times with Madison Cunningham, Watkins Family Hour, Amanda Palmer, Pearl and the Beard, Franz Nicolay, Emilyn Brodsky. and Phox.

Her full bio is available on her website https://www.theanna.com/bio-full

== Discography ==
- Beacon (2019)
- Hiker (2016)
- Driftless EP (2014)
- Canary in a Coal Mine (2012)
- Secret Cedar Room EP (2010)
- Paper Boats (2010)
- Marry Me 7" (2009)
- Nesting EP (2009)
- The Things That Airplanes Do (2007)
- Some Kind of Parade (2005)
- Sounds Live EP (2005)
- Basics Live Album (2004)

== Accolades ==
- 2014 Wisconsin Area Music Industry Awards Nominee: Singer/Songwriter of the Year
- 2013 Madison Area Music Awards: Unique Performer of the Year
- 2012 Rocky Mountain Folks Festival: Songwriter Showcase Performer
- 2012 International Acoustic Music Awards Finalist
- 2012 Telluride Troubadour Contest Alternate
- 2011 Madison Area Music Awards: Unique Album of the Year & Cover Song of the Year
- 2010 National Women's Music Festival Talent Competition Winner, 2011 Mainstage
- 2010 Falcon Ridge Folk Festival Emerging Artist
