= Franz Nicolay =

American musician and writer (born 1977)

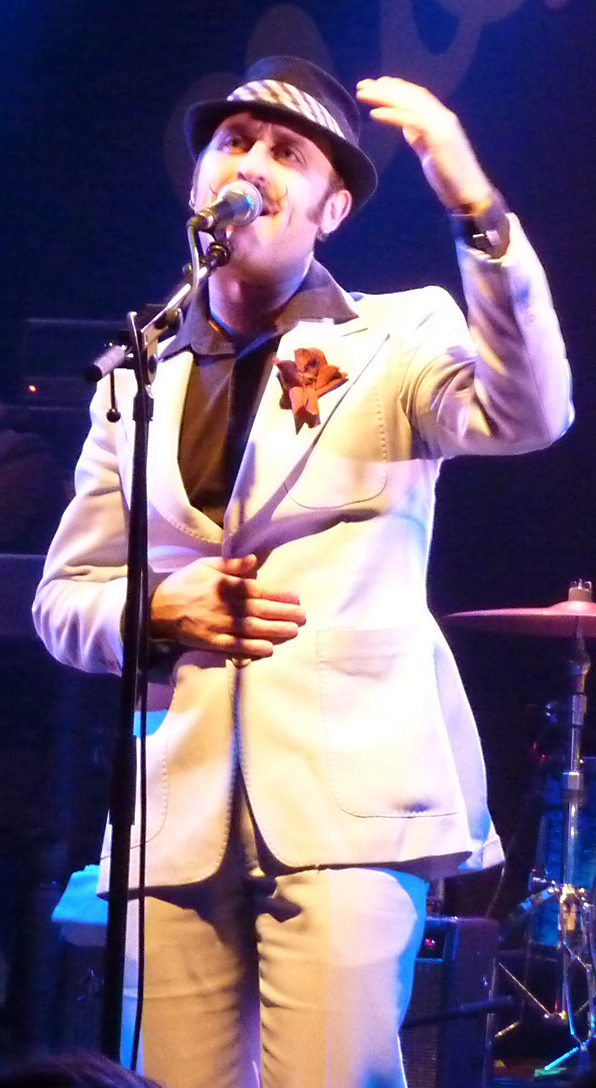
- Nicolay in 2009

Background information
- Born: August 27, 1977 (age 48)
- Origin: Center Sandwich, New Hampshire, U.S.
- Genres: Punk rock, indie rock, Balkan jazz
- Occupations: Musician, writer
- Instruments: Vocals, keyboards, banjo, guitar, accordion
- Website: www.franznicolay.com

Franz Nicolay (born 1977) is an American musician and writer. He is best known as the keyboardist and pianist for the indie rock band the Hold Steady, with whom he has recorded seven studio albums. Nicolay is also known for playing the accordion and piano in the World/Inferno Friendship Society, for founding the composer-performer collective Anti-Social Music, and for performing in the Balkan jazz quartet Guignol.

Nicolay has worked as a producer, arranger, session musician, and collaborator with Sincere Engineer, Mischief Brew, Leftöver Crack, the Dresden Dolls, the Loved Ones, and the Living End. He has performed with Frank Turner, Star Fucking Hipsters, and Against Me!

His first book, The Humorless Ladies of Border Control, about DIY touring in the former Communist world, was published by The New Press in August 2016. The New York Times named it a "Season's Best Travel Book". His second, the novel Someone Should Pay For Your Pain, was called "a knockout fiction debut" in BuzzFeed and named one of Rolling Stone's "Best Music Books of 2021". Hua Hsu, in The New Yorker, said Band People: Life and Work in Popular Music (2024) "might be one of the least bacchanalian books ever published about the rock-and-roll life style, but also one of the most honest." His writing has appeared in The New York Times, The Washington Post, The Wall Street Journal, Slate, The Kenyon Review, The Paris Review Daily, The Baffler, the Los Angeles Review of Books, Ploughshares, The Threepenny Review, LitHub, Longreads, The Week, VICE, and elsewhere.

He has taught at University of California, Berkeley and Columbia University, and is currently on faculty at Bard College.

In 2026, he testified before Congress on the LiveNation/Ticketmaster antitrust case.

In 2012, Dying Scene named him the #1 accordionist in punk rock.

== Career ==
=== Early career ===
Nicolay grew up in Center Sandwich, New Hampshire, and graduated from New York University's music program.

=== World/Inferno Friendship Society ===
Nicolay joined the New York City anarcho-circus punk band the World/Inferno Friendship Society in late 2000. He recorded three full-length albums with the band and was a member of their longest continuous lineup 2000–2008.

=== Anti-Social Music ===
In 2001, Nicolay organized "An Afternoon of Anti-Social Chamber Music" at Columbia University, a program of new music from emerging New York-based composers. This concert led to the founding of Anti-Social Music, a non-profit new-music collective of composers and performers that presents concerts of premieres by emerging (primarily New York-based) composers. Since the first "Afternoon," the group has played over 75 shows, premiered 123 new works by 28 composers, and seen over 110 performers play or record with them. Nicolay's compositions appear on their CDs Greatest Hits…LIVE(ish) and Sings The Great American Songbook.

=== Guignol ===
Guignol, described by the Times of London as "a combination of punk, jazz, folk, tango, klezmer, cheap red wine, woolly pinstriped suits, newsboy caps and one waxed moustache," is a quartet founded in 2002 by Nicolay and clarinetist Peter Hess (World/Inferno Friendship Society, Balkan Beat Box) to accompany performers from the Coney Island sideshow at a weekly show at CBGB. They became a part of the growing New York gypsy-punk scene and released a full-length, self-titled album in 2004 and the EP Drink The Best Wine First in 2005.

In 2005, Guignol made a guest appearance on the album Smash the Windows, by the Philadelphia folk-punk band Mischief Brew. In 2009, they released a full-length collaboration called Guignol & Mischief Brew Fight Dirty, which included six songs by each band, as well as covers of songs by Django Reinhardt and Iron Maiden.

"Fight Dirty," from Guignol & Mischief Brew Fight Dirty, appeared in the superhero movie Deadpool 2: Super Duper Cut, and on the soundtrack album.

=== The Hold Steady ===
After appearing as a guest on The Hold Steady's debut, Almost Killed Me, Nicolay joined the band in 2004: "World/Inferno played some shows with Lifter Puller in Chicago a long time ago, then when Craig [Finn] moved to New York he was doing A&R for the now-defunct DCN live label and signed us up for the live record Hallowmas at Northsix. Over the course of working on that, we'd go out drinking with him and Tad [Kubler] when The Hold Steady was kind of coming together as ‘this new band we're sort of working on’. When it finally happened, they called and asked me and Peter to come play on the first record (Almost Killed Me), which led to me coming and playing those three songs on NY shows whenever it worked out, which led to 'Hey, do you wanna get together and work on some songs for the new record?', which became 'Well, do you want to join the band?'"

During his time with the band, The Hold Steady earned almost universal praise by the press for their performances and records. In 2010, Nicolay announced he had left the Hold Steady after five years with the band. In 2016 The Hold Steady announced a series of concerts celebrating the tenth anniversary of Boys and Girls in America, featuring Nicolay with the band. Their 2021 album Open Door Policy (album) was their first Billboard top-ten record.

=== Solo ===
In 2007, Nicolay released Black Rose Paladins, a set of solo demos. Only 50 hard copies were made, which were sold at his concerts.

On November 5, 2008, Nicolay announced he would be releasing his first full-length solo album, titled Major General, with former World/Inferno bandmate Yula Beeri currently of Nanuchka, Brian Viglione of World/Inferno and The Dresden Dolls and Jared P. Scott of Demander. World/Inferno saxophonist Peter Hess also appears on the album. The album was released January 13, 2009 on Fistolo Records.

In fall 2009, Nicolay released the 10" EP St. Sebastian of the Short Stage, with art by Nicholas Gazin and including a short story by Nicolay. The EP featured "The Ballad of Hollis Wadsworth Mason, Jr.," based on the character from Watchmen. He also published his first story collection, Complicated Gardening Techniques, on Julius Singer Press.

In 2010, Nicolay released Luck and Courage on Team Science/Decor Records, and in 2012 Do The Struggle on Xtra Mile Records (followed by the outtakes EP Bad Advice). 2015 saw the release of To Us, the Beautiful! on Xtra Mile/Silver Sprocket, produced by J. Robbins (Jawbox, Burning Airlines) and featuring Andrew Seward (Against Me!), Ara Babajian (The Slackers, Leftöver Crack), and guitarist Yoni Gordon.

=== Recent activities ===
Nicolay produced the album The Birth and Death of Meaning and EP Follow Me by The Debutante Hour, as well as playing several instruments and providing guest vocals. He co-produced the album Killing the Darlings by the New York trio Pearl and the Beard. In 2014, he produced songwriter Emilyn Brodsky's sophomore album, Eats Her Feelings.

In summer 2010, Nicolay was a touring member of the Florida punk band Against Me!.

In 2016, Nicolay's book The Humorless Ladies of Border Control, about DIY touring in the formerly Communist world, was published by The New Press.

=== Miscellaneous ===
Nicolay appeared in the music video for the Star Fucking Hipsters' "Two Cups Of Tea."

He also appeared in the video book trailer for Salman Rushdie's Luka and the Fire of Life.

== Discography ==
=== Solo ===
- Black Rose Paladins (2007) (collection of demos)
- All Aboard: A Tribute to Johnny Cash (2008)
  - Tribute recording featuring Nicolay & The Dresden Dolls' "Ballad of a Teenage Queen"
- Major General (2009)
- St. Sebastian of the Short Stage 10" EP (2009)
- The Bushwick Book Club, Vol. 1: January–November 2009 (2010)
  - Compilation including three of Nicolay's songs
- Subterranean Homesick Blues: A Tribute to Bob Dylan's 'Bringing It All Back Home' (2010)
  - Compilation including Nicolay's "It's Alright Ma, I'm Only Bleeding (feat. Sxip Shirey)"
- Luck & Courage (2010)
- Live Free (Tour EP 2011) (2011)
- Do the Struggle (2012)
- Bad Advice EP (2013)
- Bearing Torches: The Rottingdean Session (with The Cut Ups) (2014)
- Low Bridge, Everybody Down / Home Is Where They Take You In (Double A-side 7" UK Tour release) (2015)
  - Released on Scottish DIY label Make That A Take Records
- To Us, the Beautiful! (2015)
- No Plan B (dance score) (2017)
- PEOPSSONGS (2017)
- New River (2022)

=== The Hold Steady ===
- Almost Killed Me (guest) (2004)
- eMusic Crisp Songs: Modesto Is Not That Sweet b/w You Gotta Dance (guest) (2005)
- Separation Sunday (2005)
- Live at Lollapalooza 2006: The Hold Steady (2006)
- Live at Fingerprints (2007)
- I'm Not There soundtrack (2007) – "Can You Please Crawl Out Your Window?" (Bob Dylan cover)
- "Take Me Out to the Ballgame" (for the Minnesota Twins) (2007)
- Boys and Girls in America (2006)
- Stay Positive (2008)
- War Child Presents Heroes (2009) – "Atlantic City" (Bruce Springsteen cover)
- A Positive Rage DVD/LP (2009)
- Thrashing Thru the Passion (2019)
- Four on Ten (2019)
- Open Door Policy (2021)
- The Price of Progress (2023)

=== World/Inferno Friendship Society ===
- Just the Best Party – 2002
- Speak of Brave Men (EP) – 2004
- Rock Against Bush, Vol. 1 – 2004
  - Compilation featuring the World/Inferno song "The Expatriate Act"
- Me v. Angry Mob (EP) – 2005
- Red-Eyed Soul – 2006
- Addicted to Bad Ideas: Peter Lorre's Twentieth Century – 2007
- Vox Inferne (7") – 2010

=== Anti-Social Music ===
- Greatest Hits…LIVE(ish) (2005)
- Sings the Great American Songbook (2005)
- Fracture: The Music of Pat Muchmore (Innova Recordings 760, 2010)
- Is the Future of Everything (producer) (2011)

=== Guignol ===
- Guignol (2004)
- Drink the Best Wine First EP (2005)
- Mehanata New York Gypsy Mania (2005)
  - Compilation featuring the Guignol tracks "All or Nothing Machine" and "Agada"
- Guignol & Mischief Brew Fight Dirty (2009)
- Guignol: Live on WUML 3/9/10 (2010)

=== Selected sessions and collaborations ===
- Mirah/Emilyn Brodsky/The Vibration 7" (guitars, keyboards, accordion, producer)
- Leftöver Crack "Fuck World Trade" (accordion, keyboards)
- Mischief Brew "Smash the Windows" (accordion)
- The Sharp Things "A Moveable Feast" (accordion)
- The Loved Ones "Build & Burn" (piano, organ, accordion, harmonica, saw)
- The Max Levine Ensemble "OK Smartypants" (keyboards)
- The Living End "White Noise" (keyboards, string arrangements)
- Emilyn Brodsky "Greatest Tits" (keyboards, accordion)
- Star Fucking Hipsters "Until We're Dead" (accordion, keyboards)
- Jennifer O'Connor "Here with Me" (accordion, piano, organ)
- Voltaire "To the Bottom of the Sea" (accordion)
- Mark Eitzel "Klamath" (accordion)
- Amanda Palmer & Jason Webley "Evelyn Evelyn" (vocals)
- The Debutante Hour "The Birth and Death of Meaning" (producer, additional engineering, guitars, glockenspiel, mandola, keys, baritone ukulele, ukulele, banjo, additional vox and percussion)
- Pearl and the Beard "Killing The Darlings" (producer, string arrangements, keys, additional vox and percussion)
- Frank Turner "England Keep My Bones" (accordion)
- More Humans "Demon Station" (keys)
- Junior Battles "Idle Ages" (keys, banjo)
- Anna Vogelzang "Canary in a Coal Mine" (accordion)
- Voltaire "Riding a Black Unicorn" (accordion)
- Anthony Da Costa "Secret Handshake" (keys, accordion)
- Hoots & Hellmouth "Salt" (accordion)
- Morning Glory "Poets Were My Heroes" ("casting")
- The Secret History "Americans Singing in the Dark" (vocals)
- Hamell on Trial "The Happiest Man in the World" (banjo, accordion, saw, keys, string arrangements)
- Direct Hit "Wasted Mind" (keys)
- Jeff Rosenstock "SKA DREAM" (piano)
- Sincere Engineer "Bless My Psyche" (keys, accordion)
- Worriers "Trust Your Gut" (keys)
- Sincere Engineer "Cheap Grills" (keys, harmonica, accordion)
- Jeff Rosenstock "Craig Before The Creek OST" (accordion)

=== Bibliography ===
- Complicated Gardening Techniques (short-story collection) – Julius Singer Press
- It All Changed in an Instant: More Six-Word Memoirs (contributor) – Harper Perennial
- Work-Rest-Play-Die: Essays on Bob Dylan & The Subhumans (chapbook)
- Tour Diaries 2007–2009 (chapbook)
- The Troubadour and the Patron: Music Writing 2007–2011 (chapbook)
- The Road Most Traveled compiled by Chuck Ragan (contributor) – Milner Crest Publishing
- The Humorless Ladies of Border Control: Touring the Punk Underground from Belgrade to Ulaanbaatar (non-fiction) – The New Press
- Someone Should Pay for Your Pain (novel) – Gibson House Press
- Band People: Life and Work in Popular Music – University of Texas Press
