= Almost Killed Me =

Studio album by The Hold Steady
- Released: March 16, 2004
- Studio: Atomic Recording Co., Brooklyn, New York
- Genre: Indie rock, post-punk revival
- Length: 42:51
- Label: Frenchkiss

The Hold Steady chronology
| Milkcrate Mosh/Hey Hey What Can I Do (2004) | Almost Killed Me (2004) | Separation Sunday (2005) |

Professional ratings
Aggregate scores
| Source | Rating |
|---|---|
| Metacritic | 78/100 |
Review scores
| Source | Rating |
| AllMusic | 4/5 stars |
| Drowned in Sound | 8/10 |
| NME | 7/10 |
| Pitchfork | 8.0/10 |
| Rolling Stone | 3/5 stars |
| Tiny Mix Tapes | 4.5/5 |
| Uncut | 4/5 stars |

Almost Killed Me is the debut studio album by Brooklyn-based rock band the Hold Steady, released on March 16, 2004, on Frenchkiss Records. It is considered by many to be a concept album, with several recurring themes such as near-death experiences, parties, and the fictional characters Hallelujah and Charlemagne. Its concept album roots are further explored with the recurring characters in Separation Sunday, the Hold Steady's second album, which uses the same characters introduced in Almost Killed Me. Almost Killed Me was ranked number 99 on Rolling Stone's 100 Best Albums of the Decade.

While not a full-time member of the band at this time, future keyboard player Franz Nicolay makes a guest appearance on the album alongside the World/Inferno Friendship Society bandmate Peter Hess.

== Track listing ==
1. "Positive Jam" (Craig Finn) – 3:19
2. "The Swish" (Finn, Tad Kubler) – 4:11
3. "Barfruit Blues" (Finn, Kubler) – 3:31
4. "Most People Are DJs" (Finn, Kubler) – 5:50
5. "Certain Songs" (Finn) – 3:54
6. "Knuckles" (Finn) – 3:46
7. "Hostile, Mass." (Finn, Kubler) – 3:42
8. "Sketchy Metal" (Finn, Kubler) – 4:17
9. "Sweet Payne" (Finn, Kubler) – 4:33
10. "Killer Parties" (Finn, Kubler) – 5:48

=== Australian edition bonus tracks ===
11. "Milkcrate Mosh" – 5:56
12. "Hot Fries" – 3:37
13. "Curves and Nerves" – 2:40
14. "Modesto Is Not That Sweet" – 3:12
15. "You Gotta Dance" – 2:00

Note

- The 2016 deluxe edition of Almost Killed Me contains the same bonus tracks as the Australian edition.

== Personnel ==
Adapted from the album liner notes.

=== The Hold Steady ===
- Craig Finn
- Tad Kubler
- Galen Polivka
- Judd Counsell

=== Additional musicians ===
- Franz Nicolay – piano
- Peter Hess – saxophone

=== Technical ===
- Dean Baltulonis – recording
- Matt Henderson – recording
- Seth Jabour – layout, design
- Tad Kubler – photography, layout, design
- Tim Harrington – layout, design
- Dave Gardner – mastering
