= Separation Sunday =

Studio album by the Hold Steady
- Released: May 3, 2005
- Studio: Atomic Recording Co. (Brooklyn); Gigantic Studios (Manhattan)
- Genre: Indie rock; post-punk revival; heartland rock
- Length: 42:11
- Label: Frenchkiss
- Producer: Dean Baltulonis; Dave Gardner

The Hold Steady chronology
Almost Killed Me (2004)	Separation Sunday (2005)	Boys and Girls in America (2006)

Separation Sunday is the second studio album by the American indie rock band the Hold Steady, released on May 3, 2005, through Frenchkiss Records. Produced by Dean Baltulonis and Dave Gardner, the album is the last to feature founding drummer Judd Counsell, who recorded the first half of the album, and the first to feature Bobby Drake, who recorded the second half of the album. The album is also the first to feature keyboardist Franz Nicolay as a full-time member of the band.

A concept album, Separation Sunday follows the interconnected stories of several fictional characters: Craig (the narrator), Holly (short for Halleluiah), a sometimes addict, sometimes prostitute, sometimes born again Christian or Catholic (and sometimes all three simultaneously); Charlemagne, a pimp; and Gideon, a skinhead, as they travel from city to city and party to party.

Separation Sunday is lyrically dense, full of Biblical allusions, self-reference word play, and puns. Lead vocalist and lyricist Craig Finn delivered these lyrics in a distinct flavor of sprechgesang. Musically, Separation Sunday touches on elements of classic rock, with guitar solos, riff-based structures, use of piano and organ, and guitar harmony. Structurally, however, most songs eschew the standard verse-chorus-verse song structure, frequently forgoing choruses or refrains altogether. In a review of the album, Blender described the Hold Steady as "sound[ing] like the best bar band in the world."

== Writing and composition ==
Separation Sunday is a concept album which predominantly focuses on three fictional characters – Holly, Charlemagne and Gideon – who appear across several songs in the Hold Steady's discography. Regarding the album's overall narrative, vocalist and lyricist Craig Finn noted: "It's a classic prodigal son story – except it's a prodigal daughter – where someone goes away and comes back. Someone can always come back. And that's the beauty of the stories you hear in the bible. And the ones that are most beautiful are the ones in which someone can come back and be accepted and loved. [...] With Separation Sunday, there's this general sense of how [Holly] goes off with two people and comes back with one. And everyone wonders where she went. That's basically the whole thing."

Describing the three characters, Finn stated: "Gideon was a skinhead kind of guy, right? Much like some of the people in the hardcore scene that I grew up with. Charlemagne, I saw him as a classic pimp – not with the feather boa, but whatever the modern version of that is. A tracksuit. Holly was a pretty girl who got lost, maybe someone who had come from a traditional evangelical or Catholic background. I saw her as a pretty girl who was maybe not as connected to a subculture or a real, identifiable, physical scene. Maybe she was somewhat innocent and pulled between these poles, and wanting to do the right thing still, but she's attracted to the things that those guys were leading her into."

== Background and recording ==
The band recorded Separation Sunday with two producers working simultaneously: Dean Baltulonis, who had produced the band's debut album, Almost Killed Me (2004); and Dave Gardner, who had produced Fiestas and Fiascos (2000), the third studio album by Craig Finn and Tad Kubler's previous band Lifter Puller. Bass guitarist Galen Polivka described the recording process as "party sessions, but it didn't get in the way of the work", and praised the collaborative nature of the two producers: "Dave Gardner and Dean Baltulonis were a fun team, but taskmasters when they needed to be. In managing personalities, they were great."

Separation Sunday was the band's last album to feature founding drummer Judd Counsell, who departed from the band to focus on his family and advertising career. After the release of Almost Killed Me the previous year, the band received widespread critical acclaim and received opportunities to tour across America. Regarding his decision to step away, Counsell noted: "I loved the band and I was wary of slowing their momentum. Once that band started touring it changed the stakes for me, because what started as a bar band became more of a commitment. I had been in bands for a long time. I'd committed to bands. But I was transitioning to a non-band life – I needed to find an actual job. And at the same time, I couldn't resist playing with The Hold Steady. But once they started moving to that next level, I wasn't prepared to make that commitment – I'd had my first kid."

Counsell was subsequently replaced by Bobby Drake, who was working as a car mechanic at the time, and whom guitarist Tad Kubler previously knew from sharing a band rehearsal space several years prior. For the recording of Separation Sunday, Counsell performed the first half of the album, alongside the closing track "How a Resurrection Really Feels", with Drake performing the majority of the second half. Reflecting on this, Counsell noted: "It was fun for me, because at that point I was splitting away from the band. I really loved the Bobby songs and it was fun for me to hear them, but a little strange, because I was so invested in my own part. I really enjoyed making that record, and that really comes across on those songs. Separation Sunday was another step in the upward trajectory of the band, which was a bit strange for me because it was my last record. I did have a fear of becoming The Hold Steady's Pete Best and everyone shaking their heads as I walked down the street."

== Artwork ==
The album cover was photographed at the corner of Maspeth Avenue and Conselyea Street in Williamsburg, Brooklyn.

== In popular culture ==
The song "Your Little Hoodrat Friend" was featured on the video game Tony Hawk's Project 8.

== Critical reception and legacy ==
Professional ratings
Aggregate scores
Source	Rating
Metacritic	86/100
Review scores
Source	Rating
AllMusic	4/5 stars
Blender	4/5 stars
Chicago Sun-Times	4/4 stars
Entertainment Weekly	B+
The Guardian	5/5 stars
NME	8/10
Pitchfork	8.7/10
Rolling Stone	3/5 stars
Uncut	5/5 stars
The Village Voice	A−

The album received an 8.7 on Pitchfork, and ranked at number eight on the 2005 Pazz & Jop critic's poll. The album was named the number ten album of the year by Spin. Punknews.org ranked the album at number 18 on their list of the year's 20 best releases.

In October 2025, Paste ranked the album at number 241 on their "250 Greatest Albums of the 21st Century So Far" list, writing: "Move over, American Idiot: When it comes to punk-adjacent, Bible-busting concept albums, The Hold Steady set the standard in 2005 with their second full-length. Separation Sunday told one of the most bizarre and ambitious epics of any album in the past twenty-five years."

== Track listing ==
All songs written by Craig Finn and Tad Kubler, except where noted.

1. "Hornets! Hornets!" – 4:48
2. "Cattle and the Creeping Things" – 3:47
3. "Your Little Hoodrat Friend" – 3:54
4. "Banging Camp" – 4:16
5. "Charlemagne in Sweatpants" – 3:59
6. "Stevie Nix" (Finn, Kubler, Galen Polivka) – 5:28
7. "Multitude of Casualties" – 3:06
8. "Don't Let Me Explode" (Finn, Franz Nicolay) – 2:23
9. "Chicago Seemed Tired Last Night" (Finn, Kubler, Nicolay) – 3:20
10. "Crucifixion Cruise" – 1:51
11. "How a Resurrection Really Feels" – 5:32

=== 2016 CD reissue bonus tracks ===
12. "212-Margarita" – 3:58
13. "The Most Important Thing" – 3:57
14. "Cattle and the Creeping Things" (demo) – 3:50
15. "Charlemagne in Sweatpants" (demo) – 3:58
16. "Crucifixion Cruise" (guitar demo) – 1:38
17. "Crucifixion Cruise" (piano demo) – 1:46

== Personnel ==
=== The Hold Steady ===
- Craig Finn – lead vocals, guitar
- Tad Kubler – guitar
- Galen Polivka – bass guitar
- Franz Nicolay – keyboards
- Judd Counsell – drums (1–4, 11)
- Bobby Drake – drums (5–10)

=== Additional musicians ===
- Nicole Wills – vocals
- Peter Hess – horns
- Tim Byrnes – horns
- Alan Ferber – horns

=== Technical ===
- Dean Baltulonis – producer, engineer, mixing
- Dave Gardner – producer, engineer, mixing, mastering
- Tad Kubler – design, layout
- Seth Jabour – design, layout
