= The Hold Steady =

American rock band

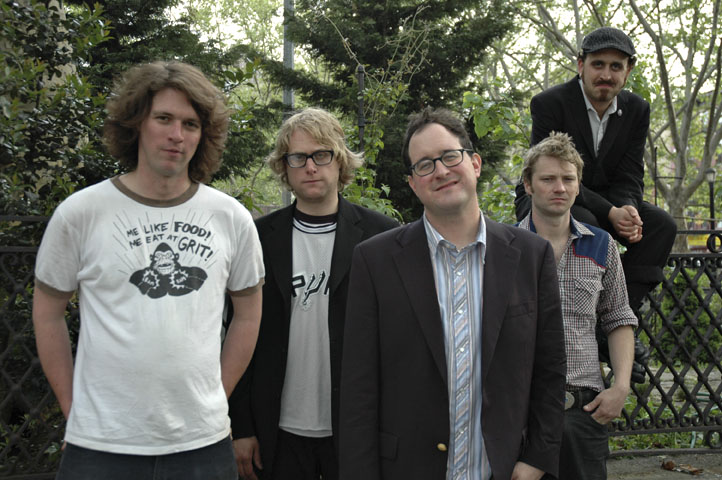
- The Hold Steady, 2005

Background information
- Origin: Brooklyn, New York, U.S.
- Genres: Alternative rock, indie rock, heartland rock, post-punk revival
- Years active: 2003–present
- Labels: Frenchkiss, Vagrant, Full Time Hobby, Washington Square/Razor & Tie
- Spinoff of: Lifter Puller
- Members: Craig Finn; Tad Kubler; Galen Polivka; Bobby Drake; Franz Nicolay; Steve Selvidge
- Past members: Judd Counsell
- Website: https://theholdsteady.net/

The Hold Steady is an American rock band formed in Brooklyn, New York, in 2003. The band consists of Craig Finn (vocals, guitar), Tad Kubler (guitar), Galen Polivka (bass), Bobby Drake (drums), Franz Nicolay (keyboards) and Steve Selvidge (guitar). Noted for their "lyrically dense storytelling," and classic rock influences, the band's narrative-based songs frequently address themes such as drug addiction, religion and redemption, and often feature recurring characters based within the city of Minneapolis.

Formed four years following the breakup of Finn and Kubler's former band, Lifter Puller, the Hold Steady released the debut album Almost Killed Me in 2004. They came to prominence with the release of their third studio album, Boys and Girls in America, in 2006. In 2010, keyboardist and multi-instrumentalist Franz Nicolay left the band before the recording of their fifth studio album, Heaven Is Whenever (2010). During the band's subsequent tour, the band became a five-piece once more with the addition of guitarist Steve Selvidge. The band released their sixth LP, Teeth Dreams, in March 2014.

Nicolay rejoined the Hold Steady in May 2016, and the band has since embarked on several concert residencies in the US, the UK, and Australia. To coincide with each event, the Hold Steady released stand-alone singles, marking the first recorded material of the six-piece lineup. Working with producer Josh Kaufman, the band released their seventh album, Thrashing Thru the Passion, in 2019, followed by Open Door Policy and The Price of Progress in 2021 and 2023, respectively.

== History ==
=== 2003–2005: Early career, Almost Killed Me and Separation Sunday ===
In 2003, Minnesota-raised singer, writer, and guitarist Craig Finn and New York City bartender and bassist Galen Polivka began talking about starting a band. Finn and lead guitarist Tad Kubler (both formerly of Lifter Puller) developed the idea of the Hold Steady when, while watching the Band concert film The Last Waltz, Finn asked Kubler, "Dude, why aren't there any bands like this anymore?" The Hold Steady's 2004 debut album Almost Killed Me, released on Frenchkiss Records, was a sleeper hit among music critics, reaching No. 31 in the Pazz & Jop critics poll that year, an achievement Finn called "like being nominated for an Oscar or something." In May 2005, they were the first rock band to grace the front page of The Village Voice in 15 years. They were Blender's 2006 "Band of the Year".

The band released its second album, Separation Sunday, on May 3, 2005. It is a loose concept album following the exploits of a character named "Holly" (short for "Hallelujah") and her quest to find a balance between Catholicism and rock and roll through drugs and a metaphorical resurrection. The album was critically lauded, and its religious overtones were picked up by many critics, such as Joe Gross of the Village Voice, who dubbed it "the most egregiously American Catholic album since X's Under the Big Black Sun, Springsteen's Tunnel of Love, or that Jewish new waver Billy Joel's The Stranger."

=== 2006–2007: Boys and Girls in America ===
After Separation Sunday, the band moved from the Frenchkiss Records imprint to Vagrant Records. Released October 3, 2006, Boys and Girls in America was ranked No. 8 on the Rolling Stone Best Albums of 2006 list, and first by The A.V. Club. Pitchfork Media's Scott Plagenhoff wrote of the album, "[Craig Finn] not only has a commanding, rousing voice but he also says something worth hearing, displaying gifts for both scope and depth that are all too rare in contemporary rock—indie or mainstream." In 2006, they released a music video for "Chips Ahoy", directed by Moh Azima and starring Avital Ash. In 2007, the band recorded a modified version of "Take Me Out to the Ballgame" to be played during the seventh-inning stretch at Minnesota Twins home games. They also contributed a cover of the Bob Dylan and the Hawks/the Band song Can You Please Crawl Out Your Window? to the motion picture I'm Not There.

=== 2008–2009: Stay Positive ===
The band's fourth album, Stay Positive, was released in the UK on July 14, 2008, and in the U.S. on July 15. The album was recorded in Hoboken, New Jersey, and Wild Arctic studio in Queens, New York, with producer John Agnello during January and February that year. Guests on the sessions included Ben Nichols from Lucero, J. Mascis of Dinosaur Jr., Emilyn Brodsky, and Doug Gillard, who played guitar in Guided By Voices. Finn has said that he believes the album "captures a band hitting their creative peak, as well as enjoying each other's creativity and company." The album is more expansive than previous releases, including talk-box solos, harpsichord, and tuneful vocals (the notoriously gruff-voiced Finn started taking voice lessons). "There are some bands that do five records that all sound similar," says guitarist Tad Kubler. "We've tried to avoid that." Many familiar elements–sing-along choruses, extended piano and guitar solos and lyrics that deal with faith, crime, rumor, loss and love—remain.

In April 2009, the band released a two-disc documentary and live album set titled A Positive Rage.

=== 2010–2012: Nicolay's departure, Heaven Is Whenever and the addition of Selvidge ===
On January 20, 2010, Franz Nicolay confirmed on his official website that he had left the band. Of his departure, Finn said: "Franz is a real ambitious guy, and I think he wanted to do a lot of different things, and we want to really follow this one Hold Steady thing to its logical end. And it takes up a lot of time. It was an amicable departure, and I think we all wish him the best. He'll do a lot of interesting, cool things."

Nicolay said that he considered his work with the Hold Steady completed: "I'm proud of the work we did together. In the end, I felt I completed the work I needed to do with them. I'd prefer to think of it as a closed book."

The Hold Steady announced the release of Heaven Is Whenever on February 23, 2010. The album was released May 4 on Vagrant Records in the U.S. and May 3 on Rough Trade in Europe.

The band's subsequent tour featured additional musicians Steve Selvidge, formerly of Big Ass Truck and Bloodthirsty Lovers, on guitar and Dan Neustadt, of In Cadeo and the World/Inferno Friendship Society. Neustadt had previously played keyboards on Heaven is Whenever, but eventually left the touring band by 2011.

In 2011, Selvidge was added to the band's official lineup. Finn said: "We added [Selvidge], we are a five-piece. We are rolling without keys right now. We did some shows without keys and we really liked it. It sort of opened things up for us. We have two pretty amazing guitar players in our band, and it's really fun to have that space and spread out. They can sort of work against each other/with each other. Steve's been a great addition to the band. We came across Steve many years ago and we always kind of said, 'Man, if things open up and we can get him in the band, we want him.' [...] Steve, lives in Memphis. So wherever we record this time, someone's not going to be at home."

In July 2011, during a five-month break from the band, Finn recorded a solo album, Clear Heart Full Eyes, that was released in January 2012.

=== 2013–2015: Teeth Dreams ===
The band recorded a track for the Game of Thrones episode "Walk of Punishment", titled "The Bear and the Maiden Fair", and released it, alongside a new track, "Criminal Fingers", for Record Store Day 2013. Of the release, guitarist Tad Kubler said, "Steve [Selvidge]—our guitar player wasn’t in the band when we did the last record so we haven’t formally released anything that he’s played on, other than an iTunes session or something like that. Having been away for a few years, we thought this would be a great opportunity to reintroduce the newest version of the band."

On January 8, 2014, The Hold Steady announced the release of their sixth LP, Teeth Dreams. It was released on March 25 via Washington Square, a new imprint of record label Razor & Tie. In addition, the band announced the release of a covers EP, RAGS, whose proceeds go to the K + L Guardian Foundation to benefit the children of deceased super fan Mike "Jersey Mike" Van Jura.

=== 2016–2019: Nicolay's return, concert residencies, and Thrashing Thru the Passion ===
In 2016, Nicolay rejoined the band, expanding its lineup to a six-piece. The band soon began performing three-night residencies in specific cities, as opposed to embarking on full tours. In 2016, they performed residencies in Chicago and Brooklyn, and returned to both the following year for the named events, Chicago Seemed Wired Last Night and Massive Nights, before performing over three nights in London for Boys & Girls in London in 2018.

In late 2017, to coincide with the band's 2017 Massive Nights residency, the band released two new songs, "Entitlement Crew" and "Snake in the Shower", with two further tracks, "Eureka" and "Esther", from the same recording sessions accompanying Boys & Girls in London. The recordings were the first to feature the full six-person Hold Steady lineup and were produced by Josh Kaufman, who had worked with Craig Finn on his solo material. The band continued to record and release Kaufman-produced singles with throughout 2018 and 2019, with each release coinciding with a concert residency.

On June 18, 2019, the band announced their seventh album, Thrashing Thru the Passion, which collected several of the previously released singles alongside new Kaufman-produced recordings. The album was released on August 16, 2019, via Frenchkiss Records.

=== 2020–present: Open Door Policy and The Price of Progress ===
On December 21, 2020, the band announced their eighth studio album, Open Door Policy, which was released on February 19, 2021. Released to critical acclaim, it was their first Billboard top-ten record, receiving end-of-year accolades from AllMusic, Uncut, Double J and God is in the TV by appearing on their top albums of 2021 lists.

On January 28, 2023 they celebrated their 20th Anniversary at Music Hall of Williamsburg. They played their first show at the venue (then named Northsix) in 2003.

On March 31, 2023, The Hold Steady released their ninth studio album, The Price of Progress.

On Dec 1, 2023 they released the 20th anniversary show recording on bandcamp.

== Influences ==
The Hold Steady have cited Bruce Springsteen, Thin Lizzy, Tom Petty, Bob Seger, the Replacements, and Hüsker Dü as influences.

In an interview with Pitchfork Media, Finn listed his biggest songwriting influences:

Growing up in Minneapolis, Hüsker Dü was a huge band. I always thought Grant Hart was the better songwriter, and his lyrics were very specific. Bob Mould kind of favored vague lyrics. But as far as detail-oriented songwriters, more contemporary... certainly Bruce Springsteen, Jim Carroll, John Darnielle from The Mountain Goats. A lot of hip-hop really inspires me. My absolute favorite stuff is Brother Ali from Rhymesayers. Atmosphere, obviously. Things like Aesop Rock, Sage Francis, Murs, all those guys. Even Jay-Z. Hip-hop is so much about lyrics, and as a lyricist it's hard not to be inspired by it.

== Reception ==
The Hold Steady have received almost universal praise by the press for their performances and early records. Their more recent releases have seen a slight decline in their reception. The Hold Steady appeared in the Season 3 finale episode of Showtime's Billions series as themselves performing at a party for Axe Capital.

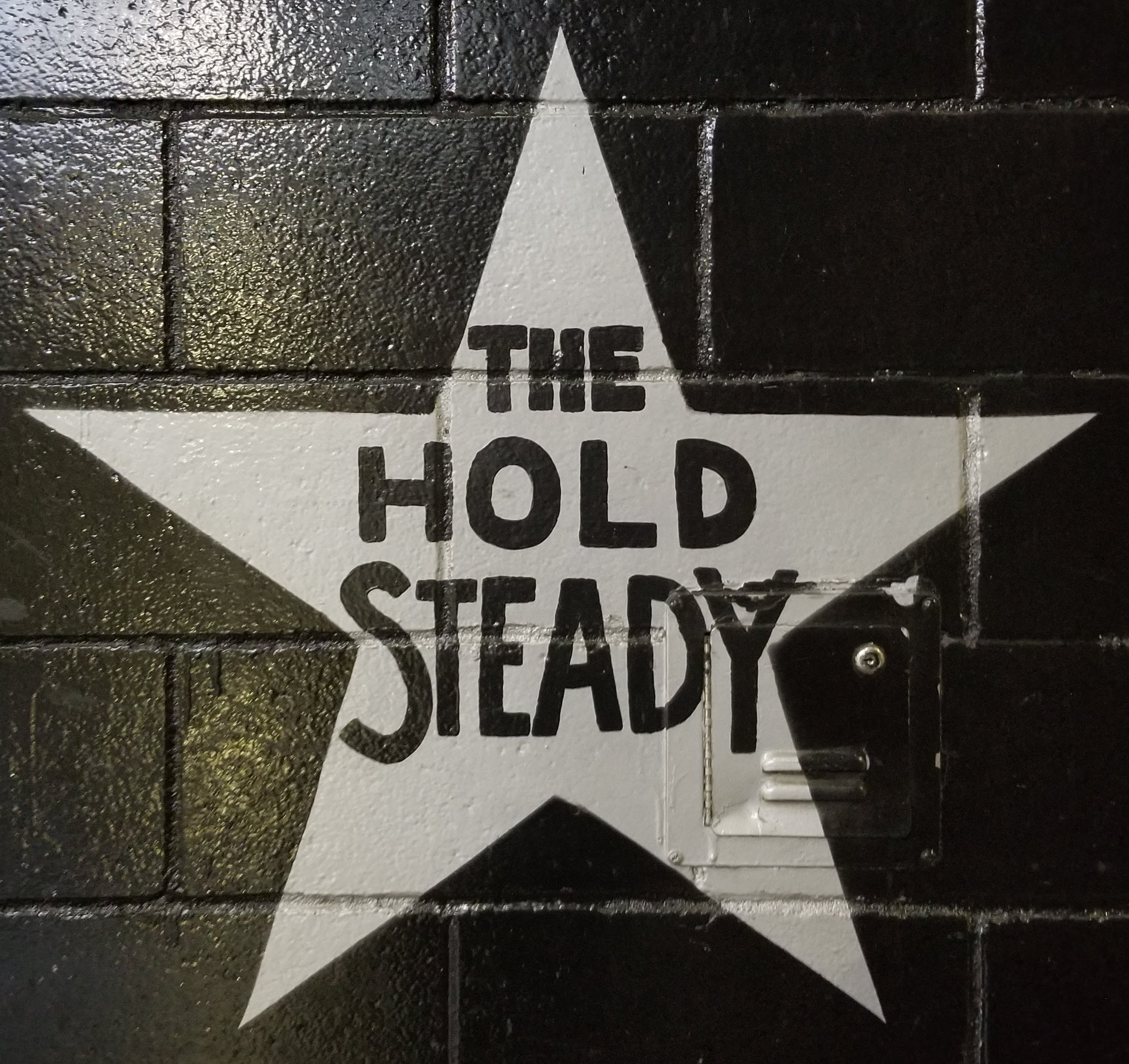
The Hold Steady's star on the outside mural of the Minneapolis nightclub First Avenue

The Hold Steady has been honored with a star on the outside mural of the Minneapolis nightclub First Avenue, recognizing performers that have played sold-out shows or have otherwise demonstrated a major contribution to the culture at the venue. Receiving a star "might be the most prestigious public honor an artist can receive in Minneapolis," according to journalist Steve Marsh. Kubler and Finn's previous group Lifter Puller also has a star.

== Members ==
=== Current members ===
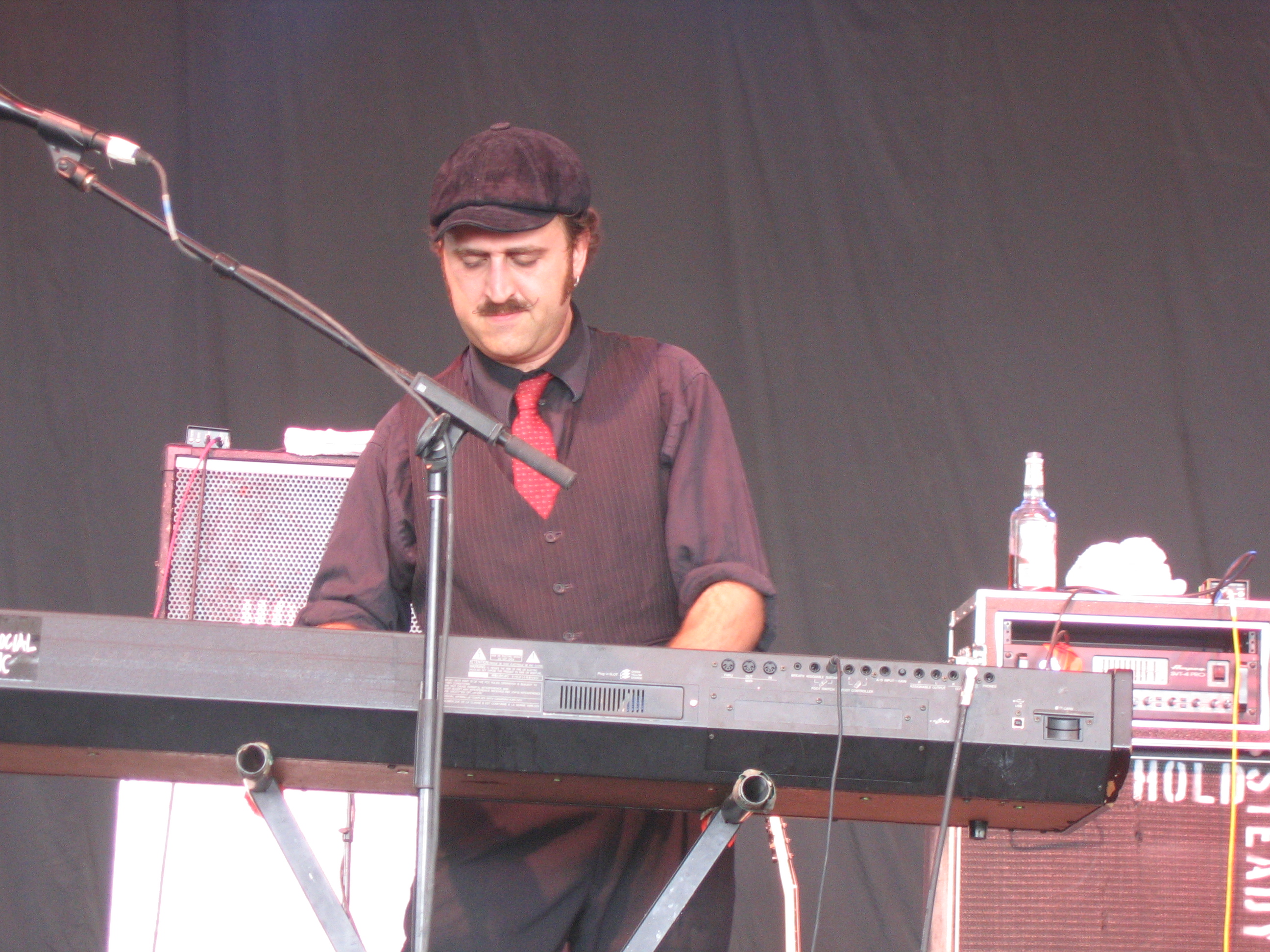
Franz Nicolay, keyboardist

- Craig Finn – lead vocals, rhythm guitar (2003–present)
- Tad Kubler – lead guitar, backing vocals (2003–present), keyboards, piano (2010–2016)
- Galen Polivka – bass guitar (2003–present)
- Bobby Drake – drums, percussion (2005–present)
- Franz Nicolay – piano, keyboards, accordion, harmonica, backing vocals (2005–2009; 2016–present)
- Steve Selvidge – rhythm guitar, backing vocals (2010–present)

=== Former members ===
- Judd Counsell – drums (2003–2005)
- Dan Neustadt – keyboards (2010; touring)

== Discography ==
=== Studio albums ===
- Almost Killed Me (2004)
- Separation Sunday (2005)
- Boys and Girls in America (2006) – US No. 124, UK No. 84
- Stay Positive (2008) – US No. 30, UK No. 15
- Heaven Is Whenever (2010) – US No. 26, UK No. 45
- Teeth Dreams (2014) – US No. 28, UK No. 50
- Thrashing Thru the Passion (2019)
- Open Door Policy (2021)
- The Price of Progress (2023)

=== Live albums ===
- A Positive Rage (2009)

=== EPs ===
- The Virgin Digital Sessions (2005)
- Live at Lollapalooza 2006: The Hold Steady (2006)
- Stuck Between Stations – EP (2007)
- Live at Fingerprints (2007)
- iTunes Live from Soho (2011)
- Rags (2014)
- Four on Ten (2019)

=== Singles ===
- "Milkcrate Mosh" b/w "Hey Hey What Can I Do" (2004)
- "Chips Ahoy!" (2006)
- "Stuck Between Stations" (2006)
- "Massive Nights" (2007)
- "Sequestered in Memphis" (2008) – No. 28 Adult Alternative Airplay
- "Stay Positive" (2009)
- "Hurricane J" (2010)
- "Criminal Fingers" b/w "The Bear & the Maiden Fair" (2013)
- "Spinners" (2014) – No. 29 Adult Alternative Airplay
- "I Hope This Whole Thing Didn't Frighten You" (2014)
- "Entitlement Crew" b/w "A Snake in the Shower" (2017)
- "Eureka" b/w "Esther" (2018)
- "The Stove & the Toaster" b/w "Star 18" (2018)
- "Confusion in the Marketplace" b/w "T-Shirt Tux" (2018)
- "The Last Time That She Talked to Me" (2019)
- "Family Farm" (2020)
- "Heavy Covenant" (2021)
- "Sideways Skull" (2023) – No. 38 Adult Alternative Airplay

=== Other recordings ===
- Aqua Teen Hunger Force Colon Movie Film for Theaters Colon the Soundtrack (2007) – "Girls Like Status"
- KGSR Broadcasts Volume 16 (2008) – "Sequestered in Memphis"
- War Child Presents Heroes (2009) – "Atlantic City" (Bruce Springsteen cover)
- I'm Not There (2007) – "Can You Please Crawl Out Your Window?" (Bob Dylan cover)
- Live at KEXP Volume 5 (2009) – "Both Crosses"
- The Dilemma Soundtrack (2011) – "Just Saying"
- Soundtrack of season 3 (2013) of the TV series Game of Thrones – "The Bear and the Maiden Fair" (lyrics by George R. R. Martin)
