= Tad Kubler =

American guitarist

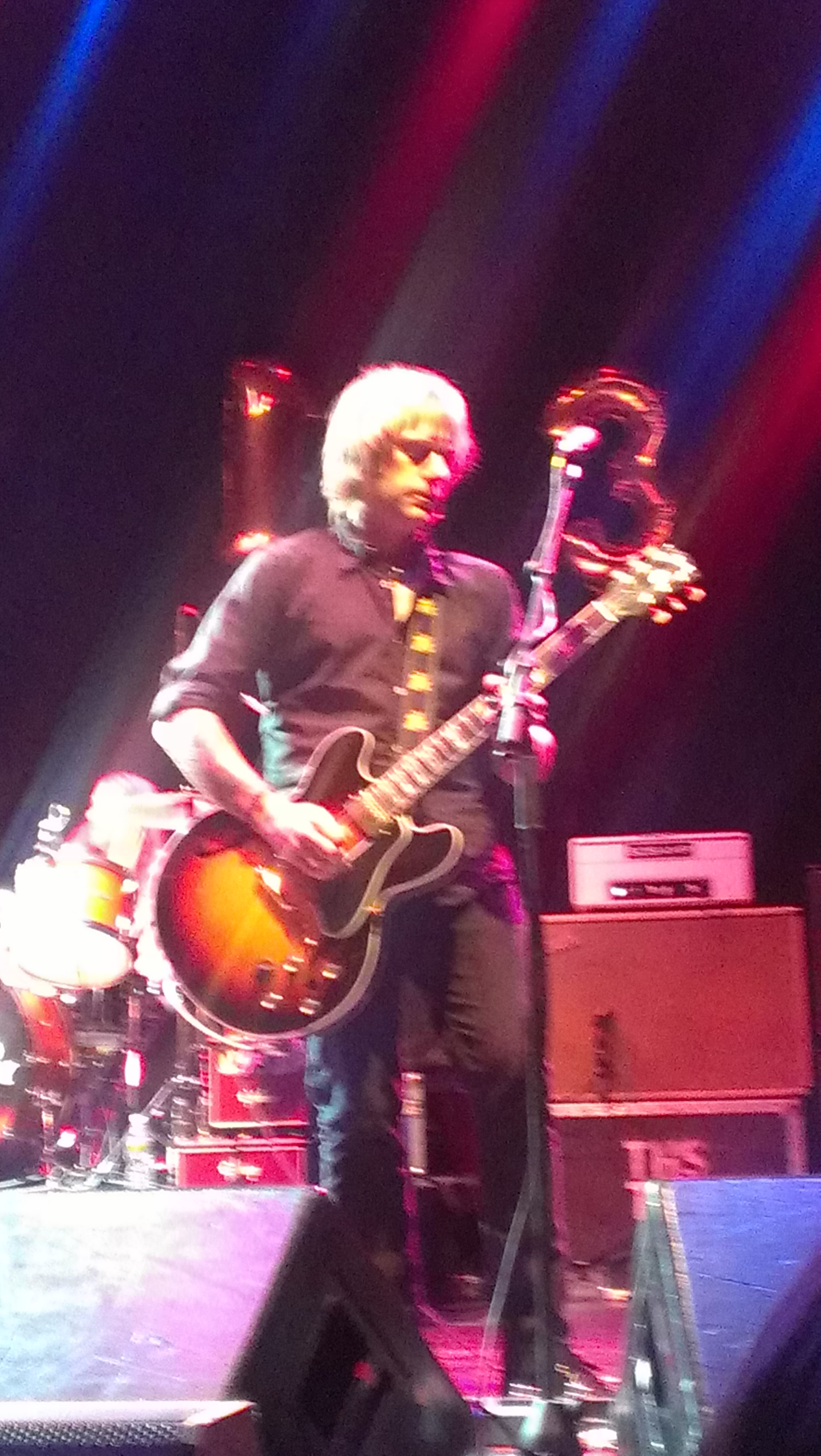
- Kubler in 2012

Background information
- Origin: Janesville, Wisconsin, U.S.
- Genres: Post-punk revival, alternative rock, indie rock
- Instruments: guitar, bass
- Years active: 1998–present
- Labels: French Kiss, Vagrant
- Website: http://www.theholdsteady.com/

Tad Jason Kubler is an American guitarist, known for his work with Lifter Puller, Song of Zarathustra, and, most-notably, the Hold Steady. He previously worked with Brett Johnson, bass player for Atmosphere, in the band Ten-fold Hate, in Minneapolis. He grew up in Janesville, Wisconsin, and currently lives in Brooklyn, New York.

== Education ==
Kubler was considered bright and energetic but difficult to handle by most of his high school teachers before he was diagnosed with ADD. He spent a year in college with a major in music at University of Wisconsin–Rock County before dropping out to move to Madison.

== Influences ==
Kubler grew up listening to bands like Queen, Led Zeppelin, Kiss, AC/DC, Judas Priest, Thin Lizzy, ZZ Top and, perhaps most importantly, Cheap Trick. When he was seven years old, Cheap Trick's manager of the time had a wife and two daughters who lived across the street, giving Kubler the opportunity to meet Rick Nielsen.

== Equipment ==
Kubler plays a variety of Gibson guitars, including the ES-345, ES-135, ES-335, and 2006 ’56 VOS Les Paul Goldtop.

== Solo career ==
Kubler released The Casanova Complex on March 28, 2026. Poetic Justice called it "engaging and an interesting EP".

== Personal life ==
Kubler's daughter Murphy is a model, working with companies such as Chrome Hearts, Old Navy, J.Crew, The Jessica Simpson Collection and Maddie Ziegler's clothing line "Maddie Style".
