= Treble in Trouble =

EP by Ted Leo and the Pharmacists
- Released: September 26, 2000
- Recorded: January 2000
- Genre: Rock, Punk rock, Indie rock
- Length: 23:08
- Label: Ace Fu
- Producer: Brendan Canty

Ted Leo and the Pharmacists chronology
tej leo(?), Rx / pharmacists (1999)	Treble in Trouble (2000)	The Tyranny of Distance (2001)

Professional ratings
Review scores
Source	Rating
Allmusic	4/5 stars

Treble in Trouble is an EP by the Washington, D.C. rock band Ted Leo and the Pharmacists, released in 2000 by Ace Fu Records. It was the group's first release as a full band, following a debut album which had essentially been a Ted Leo solo release. Following that album Leo assembled a backing band called The Pharmacists and recorded this EP, which was much less experimental than his solo releases and structured more in punk rock and indie rock. It includes versions of two songs Leo had written with his previous band, the Sin Eaters. It was also the first release Brendan Canty of Fugazi would be producing releases of theirs.

== Background ==
In 1999, Ted Leo released Tej leo(?), Rx / pharmacists, the debut album under the Pharmacists name. The release delved heavily into lo-fi slacker rock and dub-influenced rock and was a large departure from the music he was making before with his bands Chisel and The Sin Eaters. After the release, Leo started recruiting friends of his from other bands to play with him live, nicknaming this backing band as "The Pharmacists".

== Track listing ==
All songs written by Ted Leo and the Pharmacists except where indicated.

1. "Abner Louima v. Gov. Pete Wilson" (written and originally performed by Ted Leo and The Sin Eaters)
2. "Come Baby Come"
3. "The 11th"
4. "Treble in Trouble" (written and originally performed by Ted Leo and The Sin Eaters)
5. "Little Girl in Bloom" (written and originally performed by Thin Lizzy)

== Performers ==
- Ted Leo – vocals, guitar
- James Canty – guitar, backing vocals
- Jodi V.B. – bass, backing vocals
- Amy Farina – drums

== Album information ==
- Record label: Ace Fu Records
- Recorded January 2000 at Pirate House Studios in Washington, D.C. by Brendan Canty
- Engineered by Brendan Canty
- Mastered March 2000 by Alan Douches at West West Side Music in Tenafly, New Jersey
- Back cover models: The Holy Childhood
- Message on the inside cover reads: "RE: Abner Louima v. Gov. Pete Wilson. For information on how you can get involved in opposing police brutality, please contact THE STOLEN LIVES PROJECT/OCTOBER 22 COALITION c/o KHL, Inc. (Box 124), 140 First Ave., New York, NY 10009. Thank You."
