= Concubine (disambiguation) =

A concubine is a woman who lives with and has sexual relations with a man but is not in a marital relationship with him.

Concubine or The Concubine may also refer to:

== Music ==
- The Concubine (band), American heavy metal band
- "Concubine", song by Converge from the 2001 album Jane Doe
- "Concubine", song by Inkubus Sukkubus from the 2001 album Supernature
- "Concubine", song by The Hooters from the 1983 album Amore
- "The Concubine", song by The Black Maria from the 2006 album A Shared History of Tragedy

== Other uses ==
- The Concubine (film), 2012 South Korean film
- "The Concubine", 1765 poem by William Julius Mickle
- The Concubine (novel), a 1966 novel by Nigerian writer Elechi Amadi
