= Tell Balgeary, Balgury Is Dead =

EP by Ted Leo and the Pharmacists
- Released: October 7, 2003
- Recorded: July 16–17, 2003
- Studios: On-Me Sound, Providence, RI
- Genre: Indie rock
- Length: 30:39
- Label: Lookout! Records
- Producer: Ted Leo

Ted Leo and the Pharmacists chronology
Hearts of Oak (2003)	Tell Balgeary, Balgury Is Dead (2003)	Shake the Sheets (2004)

Professional ratings
Review scores
Source	Rating
AllMusic	3.5/5 stars

Tell Balgeary, Balgury Is Dead is an EP released in 2003 by Ted Leo and the Pharmacists, although it consists mostly of Ted Leo solo work. The title track comes from the band's previous album, Hearts of Oak, as is "The High Party" (re-recorded as a solo version). "Bleeding Powers" and "Loyal to My Sorrowful Country" are given full band treatment on 2004's Shake the Sheets and 2005's Sharkbite Sessions, respectively.

Leo includes three (solo) covers on this album, tributes to those who influenced his musical stylings. This styling of "Dirty Old Town" was made famous by The Pogues, while "Ghosts" and "Six Months in a Leaky Boat" were created by The Jam and Split Enz, respectively. "Six Months in a Leaky Boat" also receives the full band treatment on Sharkbite Sessions.

Lastly, the album includes two tracks - "[Decaying Artifact]" and an untitled hidden track - that are reminiscent of Leo's debut in their experimental nature. Some believe that the former was reserved for a cover of Bruce Springsteen's "Dancing in the Dark," a live favorite of the Pharmacists, but Springsteen asked for more money than the other three covers combined. Instead of paying, Leo reverted to his experimental style to allow "Ghosts" and "Six Months in a Leaky Boat" to remain separate.

The title Tell Balgeary, Balgury Is Dead and the lyrics of the title track are a reference to an Irish version of an old folk story called "The King of the Cats". Leo would later say the song was written about "many things", but the two main things were "anarcho-syndicalism... and cats". This would also show in the artwork and layout of the release, which show cats on the cover, in the booklet, and on the disc art. The booklet also shows a photo of Leo in a soccer field, similar to the artwork for Hearts of Oak.

== Track listing ==
All tracks are written by Ted Leo, unless noted otherwise.

No.	Title	Writer(s)	Length
1.	"Tell Balgeary, Balgury Is Dead"		4:11
2.	"The High Party (Solo)"		4:37
3.	"The Sword in the Stone"		1:55
4.	"Bleeding Powers"		2:51
5.	"Dirty Old Town"	Ewan MacColl	2:47
6.	"Ghosts"	Paul Weller	1:53
7.	"[Decaying Artifact]"		1:14
8.	"Six Months In A Leaky Boat"	Tim Finn	4:39
9.	"Loyal to My Sorrowful Country"		2:34
10.	"Untitled Hidden Track"		3:49
Total length:			30:39

== Personnel ==
- Ted Leo – vocals, guitar, keyboards and percussion on track 1, artwork, layout
- Dave Lerner – bass (track 1)
- Chris Wilson – drums (track 1)
- Dorien Garry – keyboards (track 1)
- Nicholas Vernhes – recording engineer (track 1)
- Dave Marsh – recording engineer (track 2)
- Daniel Littleton – guitar solo (track 4), recording engineer (tracks 3–6, 8, 9)
- Christopher Applegren - artwork, layout
