= Guitar for Jodi =

EP by Ted Leo and the Pharmacists
- Released: February 1999
- Genre: Rock
- Label: Persona Recordings

Ted Leo and the Pharmacists chronology
Guitar for Jodi (1999)	tej leo(?), Rx / pharmacists (1999)

Guitar for Jodi is the debut EP by the Washington, D.C. rock band Ted Leo and the Pharmacists. It was released in 1999 by Persona Recordings. Like the group's debut album of the same year, it is technically a Ted Leo solo recording.

== Track listing ==
1. "I Need a Roof"
2. "Lost on the Way to Load-in"
3. "The Great Communicator"
- "I Need A Roof" is a cover of the song of the same name by Mighty Diamonds.
- "The Great Communicator" is a demo presented here that would later be finished and released on their second album Tyranny of Distance in 2001.

== Performers ==
- Ted Leo – vocals, all instrumentation
