= Dirty Old Town (film) =

- Directed by: Justin Mitchell
- Produced by: Gary Hustwit; Justin Mitchell
- Starring: Ted Leo; David Cross
- Cinematography: Robert Banks; Michael Isabell; Mike Isabell; Justin Mitchell
- Edited by: Justin Mitchell
- Distributed by: Plexifilm
- Release date: February 21, 2004
- Running time: 83 minutes
- Country: United States
- Language: English
- Budget: $30,000 (estimate)

Ted Leo & the Pharmacists: Dirty Old Town is a 2004 concert film by director Justin Mitchell documenting a day in the life of Ted Leo and the Pharmacists on Coney Island. The bulk of the footage is of the band's energetic performance at the Siren Music Festival interspersed with interviews, boardwalk montages, and a cameo by comedian David Cross. Additionally, included as special features are a couple of songs performed live by just Ted Leo and a slideshow of pictures of Coney Island. This film is named after the Ewan MacColl song "Dirty Old Town"; Leo performs a live cover of this song at the beginning of the movie.
