= The Tyranny of Distance =

The Tyranny of Distance may refer to:

- The Tyranny of Distance (book), a 1966 book by Geoffrey Blainey
- The Tyranny of Distance (album), a 2001 album by Ted Leo and the Pharmacists
- "The tyranny of distance", a notable line in Split Enz's 1982 song "Six Months in a Leaky Boat"
- Tyranny of Distance, a 2023 album from the New Zealand metal band Beastwars
