= The Black Maria =

Canadian rock band

- Origin: Toronto, Ontario, Canada
- Genres: Post-hardcore, alternative rock
- Years active: 2002–2007
- Label: Victory
- Members: Kyle Bishop; Derek Petrella; Chris Gray; Alan Nacinovic; Mike De Eyre; Theo McKibbon; Scott Swain
- Website: The Black Maria on Myspace

The Black Maria was a Canadian rock band from Toronto, named after the notorious vans used by police to transport prisoners in the early 20th century (most often referred to as a paddywagon).

== History ==
The Black Maria was formed in November 2002 and, in 2003, independently released the EP The Black Maria. At the time, band members included vocalist Chris Gray, guitarists Alan Nacinovic and Kyle Bishop, keyboardist and bassist Mike De Eyre, and drummer Derek Petrella. Gray and De Eyre had previously played in the band Montgomery 21 together. Their first show was in Toronto in 2003.

They signed with Victory Records in 2004 and recorded their debut album, Lead Us To Reason, at Signal To Noise Studios with producer Mike Green. Lead Us to Reason was released on January 25, 2005, and did well, selling upwards of 50,000 copies and opening the door to tours with several successful bands, including Aiden, Alexisonfire, and Eighteen Visions. By the end of the Lead Us To Reason tour, Bishop and the other members were not getting along and he left the band. Ex-Damn 13 guitarist Mike Charette filled in, until Bishop was replaced by Scott Swain.

The Black Maria was a winner of Yahoo! Music's "Who's Next?" at LAUNCHcast. Adam Veselisin played drums on the Who's Next video and, through April 2005, filled in on drums when Petrella broke his arm and the band played shows with Zao, The Juliana Theory, Rise Against, and Alexisonfire. Petrella then left the band and was replaced by Theo McKibbon.

In September 2006, The Black Maria released the album A Shared History of Tragedy, which was written and produced by Swain and McKibbon. The CD artwork was done by Oliver Nacinovic. It sold slightly less than Lead Us To Reason but was received warmly by critics.

The band also played with Queens of the Stone Age, MxPx, The Distillers, Goldfinger, Paramore, Rise Against, Silverstein, Alkaline Trio, The Lawrence Arms, Chevelle, Taproot, and Ted Leo and the Pharmacists. They joined Evanescence (and Stone Sour) for their January 2007 tour in Ottawa.

The band announced its break-up in mid-2007. (A group of New Mexico musicians formed a band of the same name–they are not connected.)

== Discography ==
Albums

- Lead Us to Reason (2005), (Victory Records)
- A Shared History of Tragedy (2006), (Victory Records)

EPs

- The Black Maria (2003), Independent
- Waking Up With Wolves (2006, split with On the Last Day), Victory Records

== See also ==
- List of bands from Canada
