= Set You Free (Chisel album) =

Studio album by Chisel
- Released: June 6, 1997
- Genre: Punk rock, power pop
- Length: 56:44
- Label: Gern Blandsten

Chisel chronology
It's Alright, You're O.K./The Guns of Meridian Hill (1997)	Set You Free (1997)	All My Kin (2022)

Alternative cover
- Cover art for the 2023 expanded and remastered version.

Set You Free is the second and final album by punk rock band Chisel originally released on June 6, 1997 on Gern Blandsten Records. In 2023, a remastered and expanded edition was released by The Numero Group.

== Background ==
Chisel was formed in 1990 by guitarist/vocalist Ted Leo, bassist Chris Infante, and drummer John Dugan. The band originally came from South Bend, Indiana, but moved to Washington, D.C. in 1994. The band released several singles, eventually releasing the Nothing New compilation in 1995. After Nothing New's release, Infante left the group and was replaced by Chris Norborg. It was followed up by their second album, 8 A.M. All Day, in 1996.

== Recording ==
The album was recorded by Nicolas Vernhes at the Rare Book Room in Brooklyn, New York for ten days between October and November 1996. The recording saw the expansion of the band's sonic level, with incorporations of horns, a Hammond organ, and influences from Britpop. Some songs also saw the band strip back their sound to a minimalist sound to give Leo's darker lyrics to the forefront of the sound. Other songs saw Norborg and Dugan writing songs for the band, which Leo had only done in the past.

== Release and promotion ==
The band released one single, "It's Alright, You're O.K." prior to the release of Set You Free. It was backed by "The Guns of Meridian Hill", a non-album cut from the same session.

After the release of the album, Chisel went on a US tour with Karate. During the tour, the band, especially Leo, were contemplating the future of the band. The last show of the tour on May 16, 1997 in Knoxville, Tennessee ended up being Chisel's final show, calling it quits on the drive home from the concert.

In 2022, The Numero Group announced they were reissuing and remastering the band's discography, with an expanded version of Set You Free planned for a release in early 2023. The reissue, which included remastered version of the original album's tracks, included four alternate takes and versions of songs on the album, as well as the non-album song "The Guns of Meridian Hill".

== Reception ==
A review by Sheril Stanford in Lollipop Magazine in 1997 gave a negative review of the album, saying that "stealing is clearly a main part of Chisel's repertoire", likening "Morley Timmons" to a Help!-era Beatles song and "An Amateur Thief" to sounding like a combination of The Monkees and The Raspberries.

AllMusic reviewer Brian Raftery called the album "an overlooked and underrated gem" and gave the album 4.5 out of 5 stars.

Scott Gordon of The A.V. Club called the album in a retrospective review in 2007 "more focused and patient" compared to 8 A.M. All Day. MrHipster called the album in 2015 an "entire album of awesome new wave [and] mod rock". Magnet Magazine called the album "a sprawling power pop masterpiece".

== Track listing ==
All tracks are written by Ted Leo, unless noted.

No.	Title	Writer(s)	Length
1.	"On Warmer Music"		3:11
2.	"All My Kin"		4:10
3.	"It's Alright, You're O.K."		4:06
4.	"The Mutable Mercury"		3:43
5.	"The Town Crusher"		2:45
6.	"The Unthinkable Is True"	Chris Norborg	3:40
7.	"River High"		4:01
8.	"Every Is A Good Trip"		1:42
9.	"Do Go On"		5:22
10.	"Privileged & Impotent"		2:55
11.	"Oh Dear Friends"	Norborg	4:00
12.	"An Amateur Thief"	John Dugan	1:46
13.	"In Our Time"		2:21
14.	"Morley Timmons"	Norborg	3:12
15.	"The O.T.S."		3:39
16.	"Rip Off The Gift"		1:56
17.	"The Last Good Time"		4:15
Total length:			56:44

=== 2023 deluxe edition bonus tracks ===
No.	Title	Writer(s)	Length
18.	"The Guns of Meridian Hill"		2:57
19.	"The Town Crusher (Live)"		2:27
20.	"Morley Timmons (Early Version)"	Norborg	3:18
21.	"Every Is A Good Trip (Extended)"		3:48
22.	"The O.T.S. (Early Version)"		3:57
Total length:			1:13:31

== Personnel ==
Derived from the liner notes.

- Ted Leo - guitar, vocals, writer
- Chris Norborg - bass, writer
- John Dugan - drums, writer, design
- Anthony Rossomando - trumpet, horn
- Greg DiCrosta - trombone
- B.J. Warshaw - saxophone
- Nicolas Vernhes - recording engineer
- Alan Douches - mastering engineer
- Darrow Montgomery - photography
- Chris Leo - vocals, noise (track 2)
- Amy Leo - vocals, noise (track 2)
- Neil O'Brien - vocals, percussion (track 9)

=== 2023 deluxe edition ===
- Alap Mornin - recording engineer (track 20)
- Rob Christiansen - recording engineer (track 22)
- Adam Luksetich, Rob Sevier, Ken Shipley - reissue producer
- Jeff Lipton, Maria Rice - remastering engineer
- D. Norsen - design
- Finn Cohen - editing
- Pat Graham - photography
- John Davis - photography
- Mandy Berry Carter - photography
- Brian Liu - photography
- Joan Dugan - photography
- Tom Rosinski - photography
- Jes Skolnik - liner notes
