= Ted Leo =

American singer and guitarist (born 1970)

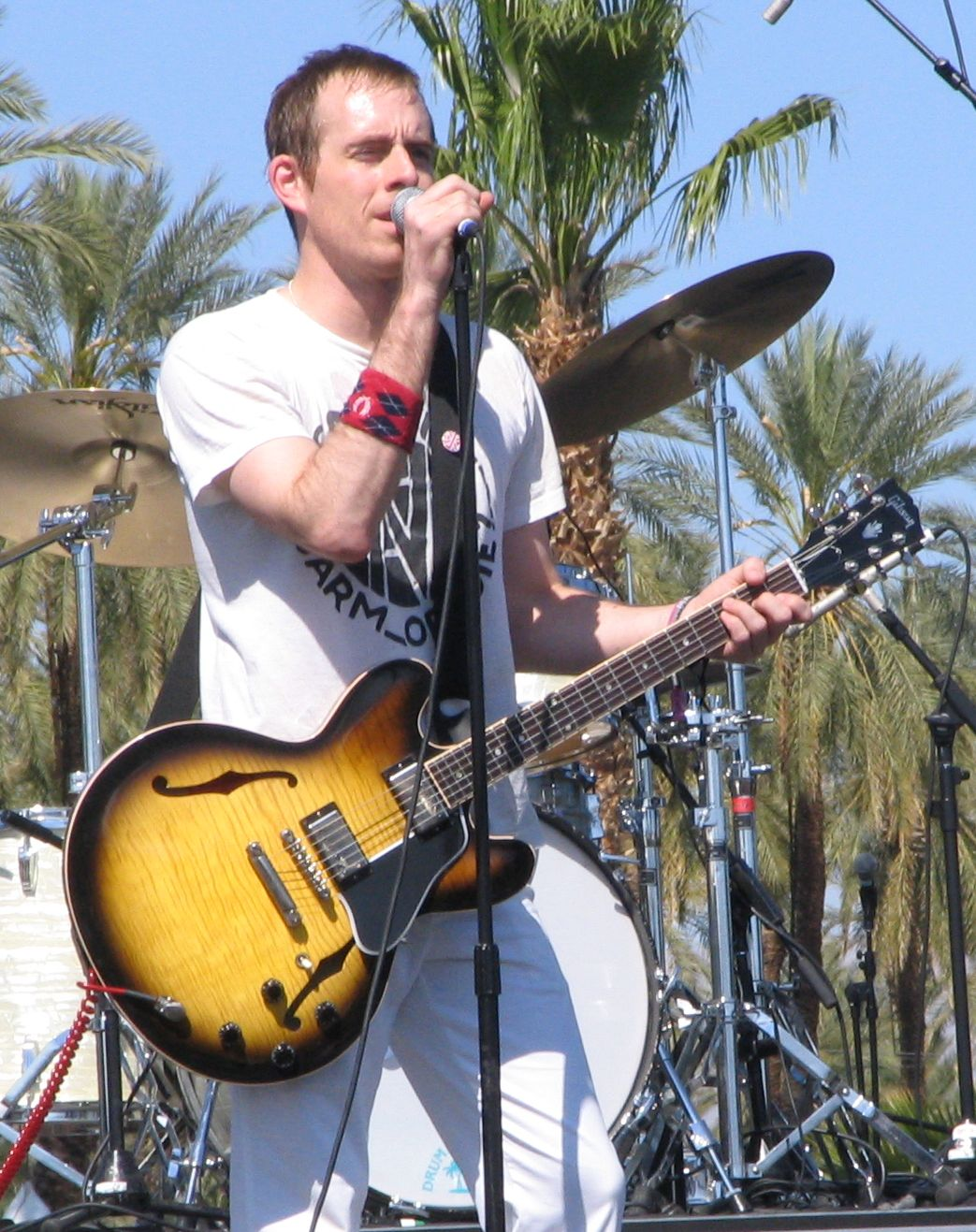
- Leo performing at Coachella 2006

Background information
- Born: Theodore Francis Leo; September 11, 1970 (age 55); South Bend, Indiana, U.S.
- Genres: Punk rock, hardcore punk, power pop, indie rock
- Occupations: Singer, songwriter, musician
- Instruments: Vocals, guitar, piano
- Years active: 1989–present
- Member of: Ted Leo and the Pharmacists, Gang of Four, The Foreign Correspondents
- Formerly of: Citizens Arrest, Chisel, Puzzlehead, The Sin-Eaters, The Both, Trendinista 5000, TV Casualty, Water
- Website: tedleo.com

Theodore Francis Leo (born September 11, 1970) is an American singer and musician. He is the frontman and lead guitarist of the rock group Ted Leo and the Pharmacists, and in 2013, he and Aimee Mann formed the indie rock duo The Both.

== Early life ==
Born in South Bend, Indiana, Leo grew up in Bloomfield, New Jersey, where his family was from and spent many formative years in the hardcore punk scene of New York City during the 1980s and early 1990s. He graduated from Seton Hall Preparatory School in West Orange in 1988 and the University of Notre Dame in the fall of 1993 with a degree in English.

== Career ==
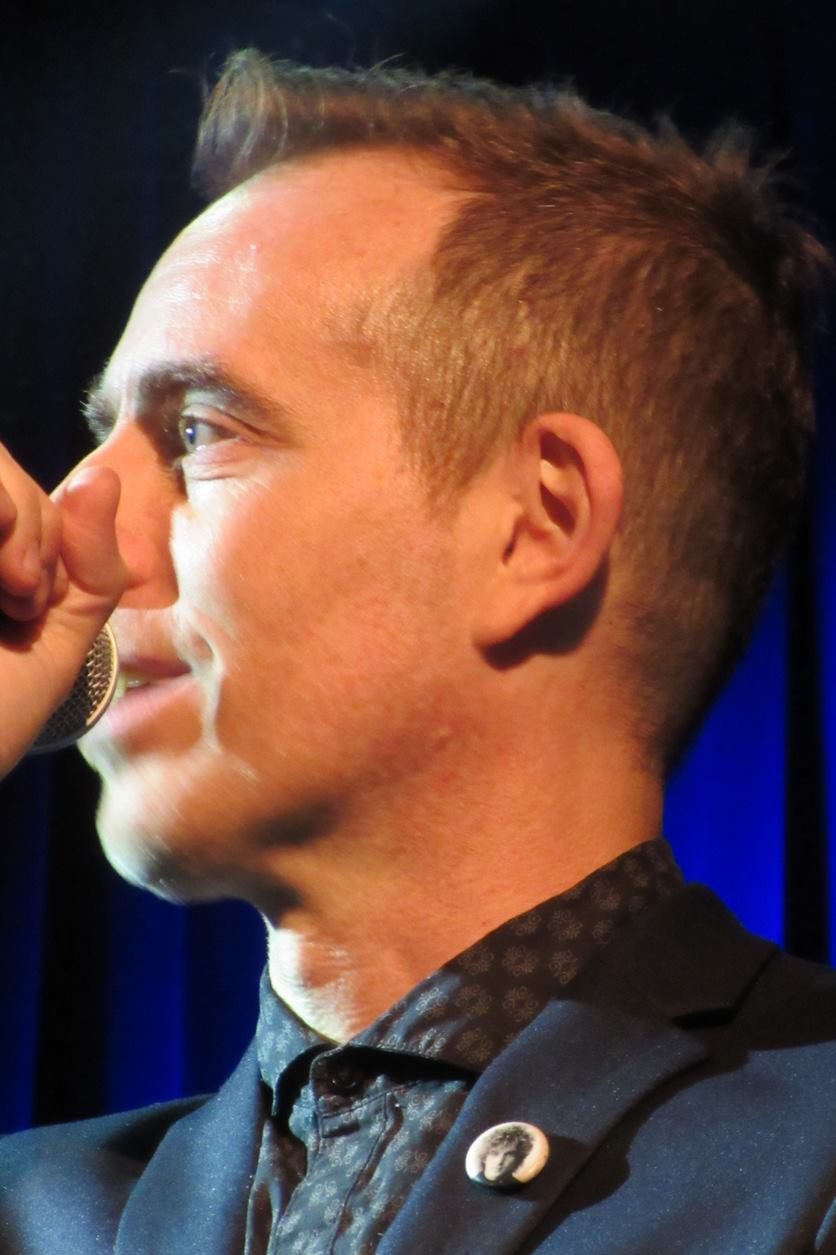
Ted Leo performing in December 2015, wearing Scott Miller button

Leo was a founding member of the New York punk band Citizens Arrest in 1989. In the 1990s, Leo played in bands that included Chisel, Puzzlehead, and the Sin-Eaters.

Ted Leo and the Pharmacists was formed in 1999 in Washington, D.C. The group recorded six studio albums between 1999 and 2010. Leo has also maintained a consistent presence as a solo performer since the 1990s.

In 2011, Leo joined TV Casualty, a Misfits tribute band. They released a self-titled 7" with proceeds going to the Attic Youth Center in Philadelphia.

In early 2013, Leo and Aimee Mann formed a duo called The Both, after Leo had toured with Mann for several months as her supporting act. He and Mann began writing songs together, and in March 2013, the duo performed their first show together as the Both (originally formatted as #BOTH). Their self-titled debut album, The Both, was released in April 2014.

Leo released his debut solo album The Hanged Man on September 8, 2017. The album was inspired by several years of career and personal hardships, including the loss of a daughter in 2011 due to a late-term miscarriage in which Leo's wife was forced to go into premature labor.

For the 2019 animated television film Steven Universe: The Movie, Leo collaborated with Rebecca Sugar and Stemage to write the song "Independent Together". In the film, Leo voiced the role of Steg, a fusion of Steven Universe and Greg Universe. As Steg, Leo performed "Independent Together" alongside Aimee Mann (who reprised her role as Opal from the Steven Universe television series) and voice actress Deedee Magno Hall (as Pearl).

In January 2025, Leo was announced as the guitarist for Gang of Four on the band's "Long Goodbye" farewell tour.

== Family and personal life ==
Leo grew up in New Jersey before moving to South Bend to attend Notre Dame, where he formed Chisel. He then moved to D.C., and briefly moved to Boston thereafter. Leo has lived in Rhode Island since 2005, and he also maintained an apartment in New York City until 2016.

Leo met his wife, musician and visual artist Jodi Buonanno, in the late 1990s when both were touring in bands. She is credited with clapping, whistle, and background vocals on the Hearts of Oak album, as well as bass on The Tyranny of Distance.

His brothers, Chris and Danny Leo, are also musicians and have been members of bands such as Native Nod, The Lapse, The Van Pelt, The Vague Angels, and The Holy Childhood.

Leo is a vegan, and has served as a spokesman for People for the Ethical Treatment of Animals. He has made frequent radio appearances as a contributor to programs on WFMU, such as The Best Show with Tom Scharpling.

== Discography ==
=== with Citizens Arrest ===
- Citizens Arrest cassette EP (1989, Lifetime Records)
- Soaked in Others Blood 7-inch EP (2012, Painkiller Records)

=== with Puzzlehead ===
- See Thru 7-inch EP (1991, Next Generation Records)

=== with Animal Crackers ===
- Animal Crackers/Whipped split 7-inch EP with Whipped (1991, Sound Pollution Records)
- Animal Crackers 7-inch EP (1993, Thrashing Mad Records)

=== with Chisel ===
- Chisel 7-inch single (1991, Assembly Records)
- Sunburn 7-inch EP (1994, Gern Blandsten)
- Nothing New 12-inch EP (1995, Gern Blandsten)
- 8 A.M. All Day (1996, Gern Blandsten)
- Set You Free (1997, Gern Blandsten)

=== with Hell No ===
- Hell No 7-inch EP (1991, Wardance)
- Skin Job (1992, Wardance)

=== with Trendinista 5000 ===
- Trendinista 5000 (1992, Sudden Shame Records)

=== with Water ===
- Aliens Born to Human Parents (1993)

=== with Ely Parker and the CIAs ===
- Live 1993 (2015, recorded in 1993)
- Practice Demos (2015, recorded in 1993)

=== with The Sin-Eaters ===
- Demo (1997)

=== with Ted Leo and the Pharmacists ===
- Guitar for Jodi 7-inch EP (1999, Persona Records)
- tej leo(?), Rx / pharmacists (1999, Gern Blandsten)
- Treble in Trouble (2000, Ace Fu Records)
- The Tyranny of Distance (2001, Lookout! Records)
- Hearts of Oak (2003, Lookout! Records)
- Tell Balgeary, Balgury Is Dead EP (2003, Lookout! Records)
- Shake the Sheets (2004, Lookout! Records)
- Sharkbite Sessions EP (2005, Lookout! Records)
- Living with the Living (2007, Touch & Go Records)
- Mo' Living EP (2007, Touch & Go Records)
- Rapid Response EP (2008, Touch & Go Records)
- The Brutalist Bricks (2010, Matador Records)

=== with TV Casualty ===
- TV Casualty (2011, Matador Records)

=== with The Both ===
- The Both (April 2014, SuperEgo Records)

=== with The Foreign Correspondents ===
- "Lovin' You Ain't Easy/We're Dancin' ('til it Blows Over)" (2024, Outer Battery)

=== Solo ===
- The Hanged Man (September 2017, self-released)

=== Collaborations ===
- "Oh, Death" (co-written with Scott Miller) on the Game Theory album Supercalifragile (2017)
- "Independent Together" (performed with Deedee Magno Hall and Aimee Mann) in Steven Universe: The Movie (2019)

=== Compilation appearances ===
- "I'm Looking Through You" on This Bird Has Flown – A 40th Anniversary Tribute to the Beatles' Rubber Soul (2005, Razor & Tie)
- "Heroes" on Let All the Children Boogie: A Tribute to David Bowie (2016, Spare the Rock Records)
- "In the Mean Times" as part of Kickstarter's "Election Issues" project
