= List of international television series premieres on Australian television in 2009 =

This is a list of international television series which debuted, or are scheduled to debut, on Australian television in 2009. The list is arranged in chronological order. Where more than one program debuted on the same date, those programs are listed alphabetically.

== Premieres ==
=== Free-to-air television ===
Program	Network	Debut date
(New Zealand) Does My Bum Look Big?	Seven Network	4 January
(United Kingdom) The Omid Djalili Show	ABC1	7 January
(United States) Zorro Generation Z	Network Ten	10 January
(Japan) Digimon Data Squad	Seven Network	11 January
(Canada) Flashpoint	Nine Network	11 January
(United Kingdom) Roman's Empire	ABC2	15 January
(Japan) Code Geass	ABC2	19 January
(New Zealand) The Zoo (Axed after 5 episodes)	Nine Network	19 January
(Canada) The Dark Years	SBS TV	21 January
(United States) Wolverine and the X-Men	ABC1	1 February
(United States) The Ex-Wives Club	Seven Network	2 February
(Canada) The Secret World of Benjamin Bear	ABC2	3 February
(United Kingdom) Lead Balloon	ABC1	3 February
(United States) Lie to Me	Network Ten	3 February
(United Kingdom) Sun, Sea and Bargain Spotting	ABC2	3 February
(United States) Life on Mars	Network Ten	5 February
(United Kingdom) Auction House	Seven Network	9 February
(United Kingdom) Customs	Nine Network	9 February
(New Zealand) Demons to Darlings	Seven Network	9 February
(United States) The Doctors	Network Ten	9 February
(United Kingdom) Ruddy Hell! It's Harry and Paul	ABC1	11 February
(Germany) Little Amadeus	ABC2	12 February
(Germany) Bibi Blocksberg	ABC2	12 February
(United States) Batman: The Brave and the Bold	Nine Network	14 February
(Germany) Benjamin the Elephant	ABC2	16 February
(United Kingdom) My Teen's a Nightmare	ABC2	18 February
(United Kingdom) Chuggington	ABC1	19 February
(United Kingdom) Gavin & Stacey (Note: Gavin & Stacey was axed after one episode in Sydney and Brisbane.)	Seven Network	21 February
(United States) My Boys	Nine Network	21 February
(United Kingdom) Not Going Out (Note: Not Going Out was axed after one episode in Sydney and Brisbane.)	Seven Network	21 February
(United States) Prototype This!	SBS TV	21 February
(United Kingdom) The Kevin Bishop Show	ABC2	25 February
(United Kingdom) Lost in Austen	ABC1	8 March
(United States) Ellen's Acres	ABC1	10 March
(United States) Carpoolers	Seven Network	10 March
(Canada) Willa's Wild Life	ABC1	16 March
(Canada) Total Drama Island	ABC1	17 March
(United Kingdom) Trawlermen	SBS TV	18 March
(United Kingdom) Spectacle: Elvis Costello with...	ABC2	20 March
(United Kingdom) No Heroics	ABC2	20 March
(United States) Oprah's Big Give	Network Ten	22 March
(Australia) / (Canada) Zigby	ABC1	25 March
(United States) Ben 10: Alien Force	Nine Network	4 April
(United Kingdom) / (Canada) Chop Socky Chooks	ABC1	7 April
(United Kingdom) Around the World in 80 Gardens	ABC1	14 April
(New Zealand) The WotWots	ABC1	16 April
(United States) Handy Manny	Seven Network	18 April
(United States) Border Security USA	Seven Network	19 April
(United States) The Evidence	Nine Network	19 April
(United Kingdom) Russell Brand's Ponderland	Seven Network	22 April
(Singapore) / (Canada) Clang Invasion	ABC2	23 April
(United Kingdom) Billy Connolly: Journey to the Edge of the World	Seven Network	25 April
(United Kingdom) Eleventh Hour	Nine Network	27 April
(United Kingdom) Merlin	Network Ten	3 May
(United Kingdom) Plus One	Network Ten	5 May
(United States) Harper's Island	Network Ten	10 May
(United Kingdom) / (India) Mumbai Calling	ABC1	12 May
(Canada) / (France) / (United Kingdom) Iron Man: Armored Adventures	ABC1	13 May
(United States) Worst Week	Network Ten	21 May
(United States) Castle	Seven Network	17 May
(United Kingdom) Timmy Time	ABC1	22 May
(United States) The Winner	Seven Network	26 May
(Italy) Huntik: Secrets & Seekers	Network Ten	28 May
(United States) Camp Lazlo	Nine HD	31 May
(United States) Loonatics Unleashed	Nine HD	31 May
112 Emergency	SBS Two	1 June
(United States) The Jonathan Ross Show	Seven Network	1 June
(United States) Firehouse Tales	Nine HD	6 June
(United States) Foster's Home for Imaginary Friends	Nine HD	6 June
(United States) My Gym Partner is a Monkey	Nine HD	6 June
(United States) The Grim Adventures of Billy & Mandy	Nine HD	6 June
(United States) The Life and Times of Juniper Lee	Nine HD	6 June
(United States) Tracey Ullman's State of the Union (Note: Tracey Ullman's State of the Union filled in for two week while The Chaser's War on Everything was suspended.)	ABC1	10 June
(United Kingdom) Beautiful People	ABC2	18 June
(United Kingdom) No Heroics	ABC2	19 June
(United Kingdom) Being Human	ABC2	19 June
(United States) Teen Titans	Nine HD	29 June
(South Korea) / (North Korea) Pororo the Little Penguin	ABC2	4 July
(United Kingdom) Nature's Great Events	ABC1	14 July
(Spain) Zoo Mix	ABC2	14 July
(United States) True Beauty	Seven Network	16 July
(United States) Glee (Note: The pilot episode of Glee first aired on 19 July 2009 following the finale of MasterChef Australia, whilst the series continued from 17 September 2009.)	Network Ten	19 July
(United Kingdom) The Last Enemy	ABC1	19 July
(France) / (United States) Pat and Stan	ABC1	20 July
(United States) Dance Your Ass Off (Pulled after one episode)	Nine Network	21 July
(New Zealand) Ten Years Younger in Ten Days	Seven Network	21 July
(United Kingdom) 64 Zoo Lane	ABC2	27 July
United States of Tara	ABC1	29 July
(United Kingdom) How Not to Live Your Life	ABC2	30 July
(United States) Drop Dead Diva (Note: Drop Dead Diva first aired on 3 August 2009 in Sydney and Brisbane, and on 10 August 2009 in Melbourne, Adelaide and Perth.)	Nine Network	3 August
(New Zealand) Go Girls	Network Ten	7 August
(United Kingdom) Stephen Fry in America	ABC1	9 August
(Japan) Dinosaur King	Network Ten	10 August
(United Kingdom) Ashes to Ashes	ABC1	10 August
(United Kingdom) The Pinky and Perky Show	ABC1	11 August
(United Kingdom) Law and Order: UK	Network Ten	12 August
(Canada) Mole Sisters	ABC2	21 August
(United States) The Beast	ABC2	25 August
(Canada) Billable Hours	ABC2	27 August
High Altitude	SBS One	31 August
(United States) Gary Unmarried	Seven Network	3 September
(United States) Squirrel Boy	Go!	6 September
(United States) Class of 3000	Go!	6 September
(United Kingdom) Fear, Stress & Anger	ABC1	8 September
(United Kingdom) FM	ABC2	10 September
(United Kingdom) Heart and Souls	ABC1	12 September
(United Kingdom) Cold Blood	ABC1	12 September
(United States) Nurse Jackie	Network Ten	13 September
(United States) / (France) Casper's Scare School	ABC1	15 September
(United States) Sports Soup	One	17 September
(United States) Chowder	Go!	20 September
(United Kingdom) Yellowstone	ABC1	20 September
(United States) Tell Me You Love Me	Network Ten	22 September
(United States) FlashForward	Seven Network	28 September
(Canada) RollBots	Network Ten	28 September
(United States) Momma's Boys	Seven Network	28 September
(United States) The Vampire Diaries	Go!	30 September
(United States) NCIS: Los Angeles	Network Ten	30 September
(New Zealand) Karaoke High	Network Ten	3 October
(Australia) / (Canada) Pearlie	Network Ten	3 October
(Japan) Afro Samurai	ABC2	5 October
(United States) Father of the Pride	Go!	10 October
(United States) Three Rivers	Network Ten	14 October
(United States) Father of the Pride (Note: Father of the Pride was originally scheduled to air on 26 February 2009 at 11:30 pm on Nine HD, but this never eventuated.)	Go!	17 October
(United Kingdom) QI (F series)	ABC1	20 October
(United Kingdom) Hope Springs	ABC1	24 October
(United Kingdom) / (United States) Jamie's American Road Trip	Network Ten	26 October
(United Kingdom) / (Canada) Guess with Jess	ABC2	29 October
Electric Dreams	Network Ten	1 November
(United States) Reaper	7Two	3 November
(Canada) / (Spain) PoppetsTown	ABC1	6 November
(United Kingdom) Dead Set	SBS One	9 November
(United Kingdom) Lilies	ABC1	16 November
(United States) White Collar	Network Ten	25 November
(Japan) Yu-Gi-Oh! 5D's	Network Ten	26 November
(United Kingdom) / (Australia) Dennis and Gnasher (2009)	Nine Network	28 November
(United States) Are You Smarter than a Fifth Grader?	Network Ten	29 November
(New Zealand) Burying Brian	Nine Network	30 November
(United States) Make 'Em Laugh: The Funny Business of America	ABC1	30 November
(United States) Parks and Recreation	Seven Network	1 December
(United States) Accidentally on Purpose	Network Ten	1 December
(United States) The Cleveland Show	Network Ten	2 December
(United Kingdom) The Take	Seven Network	2 December
(United Kingdom) Fun with Claude	ABC1	4 December
(United Kingdom) Angelina Ballerina: The Next Steps	ABC1	4 December
(Australia) / (Canada) dirtgirlworld	ABC2	4 December
(United States) The National Parks: America's Best Idea (Note: This documentary series consists of six 2-hour episodes which was broadcast as 12 1-hour episodes on ABC1)	ABC1	4 December
(New Zealand) Rapid Response (Note: Rapid Response remained unaired from 2008, and was originally scheduled to air on 7 February 2008 at 11:00 pm, but scheduling changes saw Kitchen Nightmares USA premiere instead, causing Rapid Response to be pushed out of schedule.)	Nine Network	4 December
(United Kingdom) / (Canada) Waybuloo	ABC2	4 December
(United Kingdom) Richard Hammond's Blast Lab	ABC3	4 December
(Wales) Hana's Helpline	ABC2	4 December
(United States) Crusoe (Note: Crusoe was originally scheduled to premiere on 18 July 2009 at 7:30 pm, but was pulled one week before it was due to debut.)	Nine Network	5 December
(Germany) Laura's Star	ABC2	5 December
(Canada) Spliced	ABC3	5 December
(United Kingdom) Kingdom	Seven Network	5 December
(Wales) Igam Ogam	ABC2	5 December
(Canada) Animal Mechanicals	ABC2	5 December
(United Kingdom) Barney's Barrier Reef	ABC3	5 December
(France) Bali	ABC2	5 December
(United Kingdom) Wallander	Seven Network	5 December
(United States) The Super Hero Squad Show	ABC3	5 December
(United States) / (Canada) / (Japan) / (France) / (India) The Twisted Whiskers Show	ABC3	6 December
(United Kingdom) Heston's Feasts	SBS One	6 December
(Canada) How to Be Indie	ABC3	6 December
(United Kingdom) A History of Scotland	SBS One	6 December
(United States) / (Canada) Be the Creature	ABC3	6 December
(France) / (Italy) Gawayn	ABC3	7 December
(Republic of Ireland) Aisling's Diary	ABC3	7 December
(United States) The Middle	Nine Network	8 December
(France) Combo Niños	7Two	9 December
(United Kingdom) Ben & Holly's Little Kingdom	ABC1	21 December
(United States) Superstars of Dance	Nine Network	23 December
(United Kingdom) Serious Ocean	ABC3	28 December
(United Kingdom) Teenage Kicks	ABC2	28 December
(United States) New Amsterdam	Go!	30 December
(United States) Courtroom K	Network Ten	Still to debut
(United States) The Ex List	Network Ten	Still to debut
(United Kingdom) The Last Enemy	ABC1	Still to debut
(United States) Swingtown	Network Ten	Still to debut
(United States) Modern Family	Network Ten	Still to debut
(United States) Melrose Place	Network Ten	Still to debut

==== ABC1 ====
Date	Program
7 April	Chop Socky Chooks
14 June	Nature's Great Events
19 July	The Last Enemy
29 July	United States of Tara
10 August	Ashes to Ashes
11 August	The Pinky and Perky Show
8 September	Fear, Stress & Anger
12 September	Heart and Soul
12 September	Cold Blood
20 September	Yellowstone
20 October	QI (F series)
4 December	Fun with Claude
Still to debut	Jack Osbourne: No Limits
Still to debut	Life
Still to debut	Boy Meets Girl
Still to debut	Kaitangata Twitch

==== ABC2 ====
Date	Program
18 June	Beautiful People
19 June	Being Human
19 June	No Heroics
31 July	Boy Meets Girl
25 August	The Beast
28 August	Being Erica
5 December	Igam Ogam
5 December	Laura's Star
Still to debut	Later... with Jools Holland

==== ABC3 ====
Date	Program
5 December	Barney's Barrier Reef
5 December	Spliced
6 December	Be the Creature
6 December	How To Be Indie
6 December	The Twisted Whiskers Show
7 December	Aisling's Diary
7 December	Gaywyn

==== SBS One ====
Date	Program
6 December	E2 Energy
6 December	Heston's Feasts
6 December	A History of Scotland
11 December	Top Dogs: Adventures In War, Sea and Ice
14 December	The Fixer

=== Subscription television ===
Program	Network	Debut date
(United Kingdom) Gok's Fashion Fix	The LifeStyle Channel	6 January
(United Kingdom) The School of Home Truths	The LifeStyle Channel	7 January
(United Kingdom) My New Best Friend	The LifeStyle Channel	11 January
(United Kingdom) The Diets That Time Forgot	The LifeStyle Channel	19 January
(United Kingdom) Pulling	UK.TV	19 January
(United Kingdom) The Baby Borrowers	The LifeStyle Channel	2 March
(United Kingdom) Miss Naked Beauty	The LifeStyle Channel	3 March
(United Kingdom) Filthy Rich and Homeless	The LifeStyle Channel	16 March
(United Kingdom) Trinny & Susannah Meet Their Match	The LifeStyle Channel	20 March
(United Kingdom) Can't Read, Can't Write	The LifeStyle Channel	22 March
(United States) Alter Eco	The LifeStyle Channel	29 March
(United Kingdom) Best House on the Street	The LifeStyle Channel	1 April
(United States) World's Greenest Homes	The LifeStyle Channel	3 April
(United Kingdom) Country Home Rescue	The LifeStyle Channel	10 April
(United Kingdom) Mary Queen of Shops	The LifeStyle Channel	14 April
(United Kingdom) The Wow Factor	The LifeStyle Channel	18 April
(United States) The Penguins of Madagascar	Nickelodeon	18 April
(United Kingdom) Ty's Great British Adventure	The LifeStyle Channel	3 May
(United Kingdom) Nice House, Shame About the Garden	The LifeStyle Channel	14 May
(United Kingdom) The Home Show	The LifeStyle Channel	3 June
(United Kingdom) Glamour Girls	The LifeStyle Channel	13 June
(United Kingdom) Double Agents	The LifeStyle Channel	24 June
(United Kingdom) The Week The Women Went	The LifeStyle Channel	3 July
(United Kingdom) Willie's Wonky Chocolate Factory	The LifeStyle Channel	9 July
(Canada) From the Ground Up with Debbie Travis	The LifeStyle Channel	13 July
(United Kingdom) Trinny & Susannah: The Great British Body	The LifeStyle Channel	31 July
(United Kingdom) The Unsellables	The LifeStyle Channel	5 August
(United Kingdom) Undercover Princes	The LifeStyle Channel	6 August
(United Kingdom) Buy It, Sell It, Bank It	The LifeStyle Channel	10 August
(United Kingdom) Bargain Hunt Famous Finds	The LifeStyle Channel	24 August
(United States) Giuliana and Bill	Style Network	4 December 2009
(United States) Matched in Manhattan	LifeStyle You	30 December

Date	Program	Channel
January	(United Kingdom) Modern Girl's Guide to Life	Arena
4 January	(United States) TV Moguls	TV1
6 January	(United Kingdom) Vanity Lair	Arena
11 January	(United States) Little Britain USA	Showcase
14 January	(United States) Leverage	FOX8
20 January	(United Kingdom) By Any Means	Nat Geo Adventure
25 January	(United States) Bait Car	Crime & Investigation Network
26 January	(United States) Ni Hao, Kai-Lan	Cartoon Network
2 February	(United Kingdom) Aesop's Theatre	Playhouse Disney
2 February	(United States) The Banana Splits	CBeebies
3 February	(United Kingdom) Big Barn Farm	CBeebies
4 February	(United Kingdom) The Street	Showcase
10 February	(United States) True Blood	Showcase
17 February	(United Kingdom) The Shiny Show	CBeebies
17 February	(United States) The Sarah Silverman Program	The Comedy Channel
18 February	(United States) Rick & Steve: The Happiest Gay Couple in All the World (Season 2)	The Comedy Channel
18 February	(United Kingdom) Sorry, I've Got No Head	Nickelodeon
3 March	(United States) Late Night with Jimmy Fallon	The Comedy Channel
5 March	(United States) Privileged	FOX8
19 March	(United States) Hollywood Residential	Movie Extra
25 March	(United States) The City	MTV
26 March	(United States) The Secret Saturdays	Cartoon Network
1 April	(United States) Chuck	FOX8
1 April	(United Kingdom) SMarteenies	CBeebies
2 April	(United States) Sons of Anarchy	Showcase
2 April	(United States) Bromance	MTV
3 April	(Canada) Overruled!	Disney Channel Australia
7 April	(United States) Pushing Daisies	W.
Mid-April	(United States) I Love Money	VH1
13 April	(United Kingdom) Outnumbered	UKTV
14 April	(Canada) / (South Korea) Magi-Nation	Cartoon Network
14 April	(United Kingdom) Are You an Egghead?	UKTV
19 April	(United States) Rita Rocks	W.
27 April	(United Kingdom) Honest	UKTV
27 April	(United States) Sonny With a Chance	Disney Channel Australia
29 April	(United Kingdom) The Amazing Mrs Pritchard	Showcase
29 April	(United States) The Penguins of Madagascar	Nickelodeon
2 May	(United States) Cake	Boomerang
2 May	Hot Rod TV	Discovery HD
2 May	(United States) Running in Heels	E!
2 May	(United States) Special Agent Oso	Playhouse Disney
3 May	(United Kingdom) Mountain	BBC HD
3 May	(United Kingdom) Oceans	BBC HD
5 May	(United States) Nitro Circus	MTV
6 May	(United States) Date My Ex: Jo & Slade	Arena
8 May	(Canada) Star Racer	Discovery HD
11 May	(United States) Chowder	Cartoon Network
14 May	(United States) Tool Academy	MTV
16 May	(United States) Shatner's Raw Nerve	Bio.
23 May	(United States) Chopped	LifeStyle Food
26 May	(United Kingdom) Apparitions	UKTV / BBC HD
28 May	(United States) / (Canada) Sanctuary	Sci Fi
29 May	Action Man	Boomerang
4 June	(United States) Real Interrogations	Crime & Investigation Network
6 June	(United States) America's Best Dance Crew	MTV
9 June	(United States) Dollhouse	FOX8
9 June	(United States) The Real Housewives of Atlanta	Arena
10 June	(United States) Sober House	bio.
22 June	(United States) Saving Grace	Showcase
28 June	(Canada) Chuck's Day Off	LifeStyle FOOD
1 July	(United States) Moral Orel	The Comedy Channel
1 July	(United States) The Secret Life of the American Teenager	FOX8
8 July	(United States) Uniform Justice: The Real NCIS	Crime & Investigation Network
13 July	(United States) The Marvelous Misadventures of Flapjack	Cartoon Network
16 July	(United States) Scream Queens	MTV
5 August	(United States) Blonde Charity Mafia	MTV
19 August	(France) Matt's Monsters	Cartoon Network
19 August	(United Kingdom) The Making of Me	BBC Knowledge
22 August	(France) The Garfield Show	Cartoon Network
27 August	(United Kingdom) Demons	Sci Fi Channel
5 September	(United States) Reality Hell	E!
7 September	(United States) Kourtney and Khloé Take Miami	E!
7 September	(United Kingdom) Seven Ages of Rock	BBC Knowledge
7 September	(United States) Better Off Ted	The Comedy Channel
8 September	(United States) Head Case	Movie Extra
14 September	(Canada) The Border	W.
15 September	(United States) The Jay Leno Show	The Comedy Channel
16 September	(United States) Tabatha's Salon Takeover	Arena
23 September	(United States) The Fashion Show	Arena
23 September	(United States) Rob Dyrdek's Fantasy Factory	MTV
6 October	(United States) Pranked	MTV
7 October	(United States) Sex...With Mom and Dad	MTV
9 October	(United States) Stargate Universe	Sci Fi Channel
13 October	New Zealand's Next Top Model	FOX8
17 October	(United States) She's Got the Look	W.
27 October	(Canada) World of Quest	Cartoon Network
October	(United States) Human Wrecking Balls	National Geographic Channel
2 November	(United Kingdom) Horne & Corden	UK.TV
2 November	(United Kingdom) Free Agents	UK.TV
3 November	(United States) Leave it to Lamas	E!
4 November	(United Kingdom) Personal Affairs	UK.TV
4 November	(United Kingdom) Perfect Catch	E!
13 November	(United States) Bridget's Sexiest Beaches	Discovery Travel & Living
13 November	(United States) The Next Iron Chef	LifeStyle Food
15 November	(United States) I Propose	Style Network
15 November	(United States) Peter Perfect	Style Network
15 November	(United States) How Do I Look?	Style Network
15 November	(United States) My Celebrity Home	Style Network
15 November	(United States) Clean House	Style Network
15 November	(United States) I Married a Princess	LifeStyle You
15 November	(United States) Tough Love	LifeStyle You
15 November	(United Kingdom) Underage & Pregnant	LifeStyle You
16 November	(United Kingdom) ...And Proud	LifeStyle You
16 November	(United Kingdom) The Biggest Loser UK	LifeStyle You
16 November	(United Kingdom) Diet Doctors	LifeStyle You
16 November	(United States) Diet Tribe	LifeStyle You
16 November	(United States) My Workout	LifeStyle You
17 November	(Canada) Revamped	LifeStyle You
17 November	(United Kingdom) Shopping Is My Life	LifeStyle You
17 November	(United Kingdom) 10 Years Younger: The Challenge	LifeStyle You
17 November	(United States) Ruby	Style Network
18 November	(United Kingdom) Farm of Fussy Eaters	LifeStyle You
19 November	(United States) Blush: The Search For the Next Great Makeup Artist	LifeStyle You
19 November	(United Kingdom) Four Weddings	LifeStyle You
19 November	(United Kingdom) Twiggy's Frock Exchange	LifeStyle You
20 November	(United Kingdom) The Mansion	LifeStyle You
20 November	(United Kingdom) Bride & Grooming	LifeStyle You
22 November	(United States) Rescue Ink	National Geographic Channel
22 November	(United States) 16 and Pregnant	MTV
25 November	(United States) Hung	Showcase
28 November	(United States) Scott Baio Is 45...and Single	W.
29 November	(United States) Legend of the Seeker	FOX8
1 December	(United States) Party Down	Movie Extra
1 December	(United Kingdom) Ray Mears' Northern Wilderness	BBC Knowledge
7 December	(United Kingdom) Help! I've Got...	LifeStyle You
10 December	(United Kingdom) Coleen's Real Women	LifeStyle You
Still to debut	(United States) Judgement Day	TBA
Still to debut	(Canada) Jetstream	TBA
Still to debut	(United States) Deadly Women	Crime & Investigation Network
Still to debut	(Canada) Tube Tales: TV's Real Stories	bio.
Still to debut	(United States) Air Combat	TBA
Still to debut	(Canada) Cracked Not Broken	TBA
Still to debut	(United States) Queen Rania of Jordan	Bio.
Still to debut	(United States) Caught: The Ice Chest Murders	TBA
Still to debut	(United States) Healer or Hoaxer	TBA
Still to debut	(United States) Secrets of Angels, Demons and Masons	TBA
