= Cù-sìth =

Irish and Scottish mythical creature

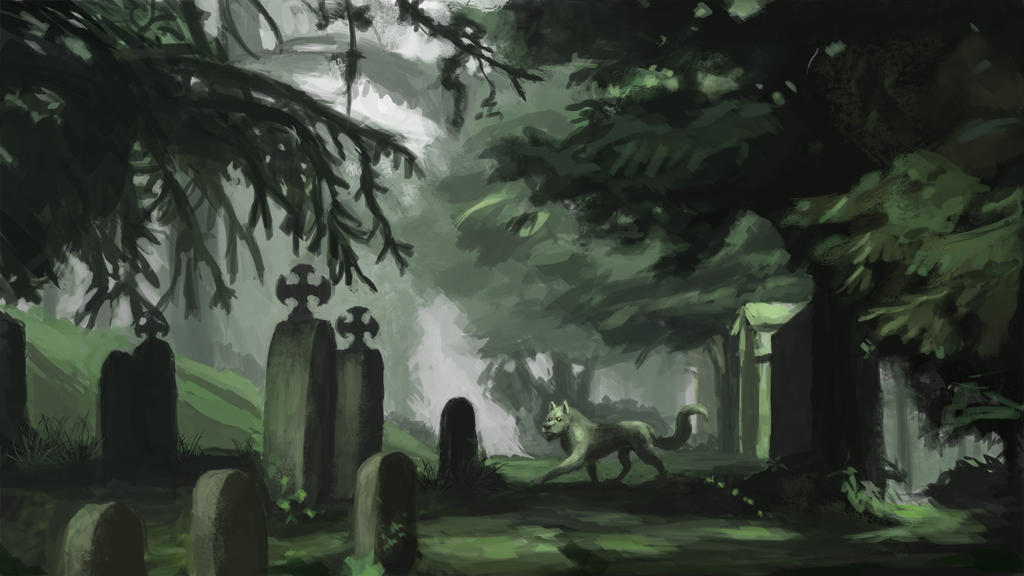
- Modern artistic rendition of the Cù-sìth

Creature information
- Other name: Cu Sidhe
- Similar entities: Cŵn Annwn
- Folklore: Irish folklore, Scottish folklore

Origin
- Habitat: Highlands

The cù-sìth(e) (Scottish Gaelic pronunciation: [kʰuː ˈʃiː]), plural coin-shìth(e) (Scottish Gaelic pronunciation: [kʰɔɲ ˈhiː]) is a mythical hound found in Irish folklore and Scottish folklore. In Irish folklore it is spelled cú sídhe, and it also bears some resemblance to the Welsh Cŵn Annwn.

The cù-sìth is thought to make its home in the clefts of rocks and to roam the moors of the Highlands. It is usually described as having a shaggy, dark green coat with deeper green fur on the ears and more yellow fur towards the feet. It is said to be the size of a small cow with footprints about the width of a human hand with splayed fingers. The tail is sometimes described as long and coiled up on its back, and sometimes as flat and plaited "like the straw rug of a pack-saddle".

The Cù-Sìth was considered to be more dangerous than the similar Cat-Sith, as it was able to take the souls of the living as opposed to just those of the dead.

According to legend, the creature was capable of hunting silently, but would occasionally let out three terrifying barks, and only three, that could be heard for miles by those listening for it, even far out at sea. Those who hear the barking of the Cù-Sìth must reach safety by the third bark or be overcome with terror to the point of death. Women who were breastfeeding were considered more vulnerable to attacks of the Cù-Sìth, as it was believed that it would kidnap them and force them to nurse faerie children. Some sources say that it only ever traveled in a straight line while hunting. In addition to humans, it also preyed on other dogs. When Coin-shìth weren't hunting, they were used by the Fae Folk as watchdogs or as expedition companions.

== Mentions in the Modern Era ==
In Ivory MacIntyre's Chalice Trilogy, the Cù Sìth appear as shapeshifters who hide from humanity.

== See also ==
- Cat-sìth
- Aos Sí
- Black dog
  - Black Shuck
  - Cŵn Annwn
- Ozark Howler
