= Grimalkin =

Term for a cat

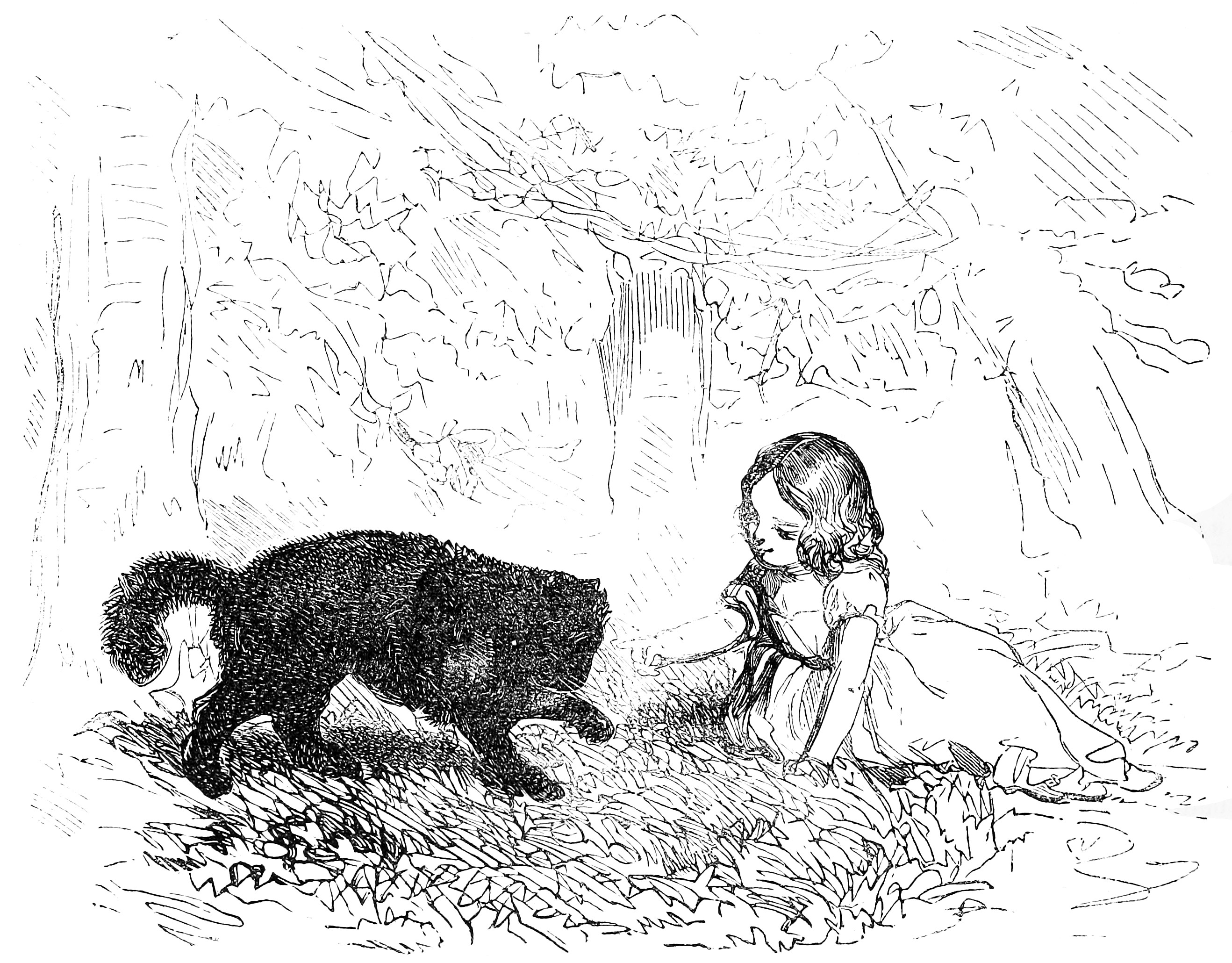
Louis Le Breton's illustration of a grimalkin from the Dictionnaire Infernal

A grimalkin, also known as a greymalkin, is an archaic term for a cat, especially an old female. The term stems from "grey" (the colour) plus "malkin", an archaic term with several meanings (a low class woman, a weakling, a mop, or a name) derived from a hypocoristic form of the female name Maud. Scottish legend makes reference to the grimalkin as a faery cat that dwells in the highlands.

During the early modern period, the name grimalkin – and cats in general – became associated with the devil and witchcraft. Women tried as witches in the 16th, 17th and 18th centuries were often accused of having a familiar, frequently a grimalkin. In Macbeth, Act 1, Scene 1, the First Witch says, "I come, Graymalkin" to her familiar (Shakespeare 1.1.8). In Roger Zelazny's fantasy novel A Night in the Lonesome October (1993), "Graymalk" is the name of a cat owned by a witch, possibly in reference to Macbeth.

== See also ==
- Black cat
- Kellas cat
- Cat-sìth
