= Where Have All the Rude Boys Gone? =

Single by Ted Leo and the Pharmacists

from the album Hearts Of Oak
- Recorded: September 2002
- Genre: Punk rock, indie rock
- Length: 5:02
- Label: Lookout!

"Where Have All the Rude Boys Gone?" is a song by Ted Leo and the Pharmacists from their 2003 release Hearts Of Oak. It was the single from the record, and the video received airtime on MTV. The lyrics of the song pine for an older age of ska music and the "rude boys" who represented its most dedicated fans. Additionally, the song is thoroughly laced with references to The Specials, The Selecter, The Beat and other ska bands from the Two-tone era. The video is based on the 1962 horror film Carnival of Souls.

Canadian folk singer-songwriter Basia Bulat performed a version of the song in August 2011 for The A.V. Club's A.V. Undercover series.

Online music website Pitchfork spoke very positively about this song. They placed it at number 18 on their list of the "Top 50 Singles of 2003". This was also included at number 124 on Pitchfork's list "The 200 Best Songs of the 2000s". This song was placed in the 2003 – 2006 section on the "Pitchfork 500".
