= Cat-sìth =

Cat spirit in Celtic mythology

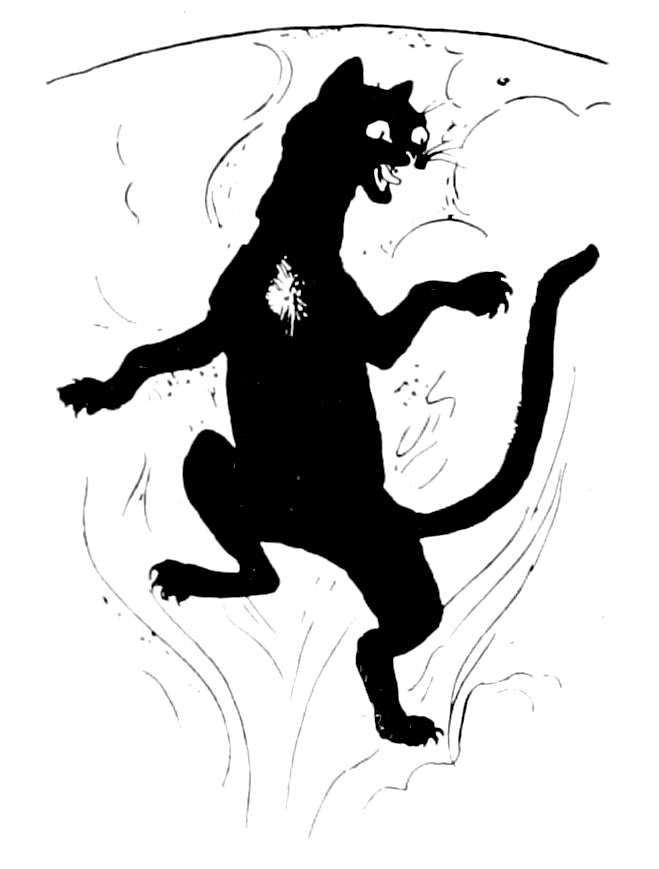
- An Illustration from More English Fairy Tales from the story "The King of the Cats".

Creature information
- Other name(s): Cat-sidhe, Fairy Cat
- Grouping: Legendary creature
- Sub grouping: Fairy, witch
- Similar entities: Phantom cat
- Folklore: Scottish, Irish

Origin
- Country: Scotland
- Region: Scottish Highlands

The cat-sìth (Scottish Gaelic: [kʰaʰt̪ ˈʃiː], plural cait-shìth), in Irish cat sí (Irish: [kat̪ˠ ˈʃiː]), is a fairy creature from Celtic mythology, said to resemble a large black cat with a white spot on its chest that walks on its hind legs. Legend has it that the spectral cat haunts the Scottish Highlands. The legends surrounding this creature are more common in Scottish folklore, but a few occur in Irish. Some common folklore suggested that the cat-sìth was not a fairy, but a witch that could transform into a cat nine times.

The cat-sìth may have been inspired by the Scottish wildcat itself. Furthermore, it is also possible that the legends of the cat-sìth were inspired by Kellas cats, which are a distinctive hybrid between Scottish wildcats and domestic cats found only in Scotland.

== Appearance ==
The cat-sìth is all black with the exception of a white spot on its chest. It is described as being as large as a dog and chooses to display itself with its back arched and bristles erect. When the cat-sìth thinks no humans are watching, it walks on its hind legs, which is how many stories of a cat-sìth being discovered happen. Around humans, the cat-sìth will try and appear bigger by arching its back and making its fur stand on end as a way to show dominance.

== The King of the Cats ==
In the English folk tale "The King of the Cats", a man comes home to tell his wife and cat, Old Tom, that he saw nine black cats with white spots on their chests carrying a coffin with a crown on it. One of the nine cats says to the man "Tell Tom Tildrum that Tim Toldrum is dead." Old Tom then exclaims, "What?! Old Tim dead! Then I'm the King o' the Cats!" The cat then climbs up the chimney and is never seen again.

== Rituals ==
The cat-sìth were believed to steal the souls of the recently deceased that hadn't gone to the land of the dead. This would happen by a cat-sìth crossing over a new dead body. Before morgues were common, these bodies were kept in a room in the home or in the barn until the body could be buried so people could pay their respects to the body.

To avoid the soul being taken during this period, people would stay to watch the body in a vigil called the Late Wake or Fèill Fhadalach in Irish Gaelic. People would distract the cat-sìth away from the body with things like music, games, dance, or catnip. It was also suggested not to light a fire near the body as cat-sìth was attracted to the heat.

Around Samhain, it was custom to leave out a saucer of milk for them. If you did, your household would receive good luck for the year. If you didn't, the cat-sìth would return the favor and dry up the milk of the house's cows.

== Witches ==
Some people believed that the cat-sìth was a witch or demon in the guise of an animal, and that cat-sìth had no connection to fairies. If the witches have changed nine times, they will be stuck as a cat-sìth for the rest of their life.

One story where the cat-sìth is a witch is

Once upon a time there was a man living near Ballymalis Castle, called Jeramiah Carter. One day he went to Killorglin to buy sheep. When he came home his wife told him that the cat was making mournful noise around the house all day. He went to hunt out the cat but couldn’t find it. Next day his sheep strayed away and he did not know where to find them. At last he said he would go towards the castle in search of them. When he reached Ballymalis Castle he heard a great wailing within. He waited for an hour, and at last a big cat came out on top of the castle. The cat spoke to him and told to tell her sister at home that her mother was dead. He got his sheep and went home. When he reached home he told his wife what the cat had said. When the other cat heard the news, she went away and was never seen again. It is said that those two cats were witches. They went to Ballymalis Castle and were there for many years after. I heard this story from my mother and she heard it from her uncle, who was seventy years at that time. — Margaret Doyle, The Schools’ Collection: County Kerry, The Schools’ Collection

== Summoning ==
The demonic cat-sìth called Big Ears could be summoned (Gaelic taghairm Scottish Gaelic pronunciation: [tɤrʲɤm]) to appear and grant any wish to those who took part in the ceremony. The ceremony required practitioners to burn the bodies of cats over the course of four days and nights.

== See also ==
- Aos Sí
- Beast of Bodmin
- Cù-sìth
- Cath Palug
- Grimalkin
- Kellas cat
- List of fictional cats
- Phantom cat
- "The Black Cat" (short story)
