= Rapid Response =

EP by Ted Leo and the Pharmacists
- Released: 2008
- Label: Touch and Go

Ted Leo and the Pharmacists chronology
| Mo' Living (2007) | Rapid Response (2008) | The Brutalist Bricks (2010) |

Rapid Response is an EP released by Ted Leo and the Pharmacists on September 15, 2008. The EP was released in response to the treatment of protestors at the 2008 Republican National Convention, which occurred September 1–4, 2008. It was available exclusively on the internet, primarily sold through iTunes. At release, proceeds from sales of the album were donated to benefit Democracy Now! and the Minneapolis chapter of Food Not Bombs. The EP contained four songs; the first two tracks were written by Leo, while the second two were covers.

A re-recorded version of "Mourning In America" would show up on the band's 2010 album The Brutalist Bricks.

== Track listing ==
1. "Paranoia (Never Enough)"
2. "Mourning In America"
3. "I've Got Your Number" (Cock Sparrer cover)
4. "Nobody's Driving" (Amebix cover)
