= Sharkbite Sessions =

EP by Ted Leo and the Pharmacists
- Released: February 2005
- Recorded: Sharkbite Studios, Oakland, CA
- Genres: Indie rock, punk rock
- Length: 9:16
- Label: Lookout! Records

Ted Leo and the Pharmacists chronology
Shake the Sheets (2004)	Sharkbite Sessions (2005)	Living With the Living (2007)

Sharkbite Sessions is an EP released in 2005 by Ted Leo and the Pharmacists. During their late 2004 tour promoting the Shake the Sheets album, the band stopped over at Sharkbite Studios in Oakland, CA. There, the band—along with Ryan Massey of Communiqué—recorded full-band versions of two songs featured on 2003's Tell Balgeary, Balgury Is Dead EP and one that has become a staple of the Pharmacists' live sets.

"Six Months in a Leaky Boat" and "Suspect Device" are covers, originally written and performed by Split Enz and Stiff Little Fingers, respectively. The EP was previously only available for paid download from the iTunes Music Store and Amazon, but is now available on most streaming services.

== Track listing ==
1. "Loyal to My Sorrowful Country" – 2:22
2. "Six Months in a Leaky Boat" – 4:10
3. "Suspect Device" – 2:44
