= Lead Us to Reason =

Studio album by The Black Maria
- Released: January 25, 2005
- Genre: Post-hardcore
- Length: 37:21
- Label: Victory
- Producer: Mike Green

The Black Maria chronology
Lead Us to Reason (2005)	A Shared History of Tragedy (2006)

Professional ratings
Review scores
Source	Rating
AllMusic	4/5 stars

Lead Us to Reason is the debut album from Canadian band The Black Maria.

== Track listing ==
1. "The Memento" – 3:16
2. "Betrayal" – 3:39
3. "Organs" – 2:48
4. "Our Commitment's a Sickness" – 3:30
5. "The Distance from the Bottom" – 3:45
6. "The Lines We Cross" – 3:17
7. "Mirrors and Cameras" – 3:54
8. "Sirens" – 3:05
9. "To Have Loved" – 3:49
10. "Ash" – 3:19
11. "Rats in the Prison" – 2:58
