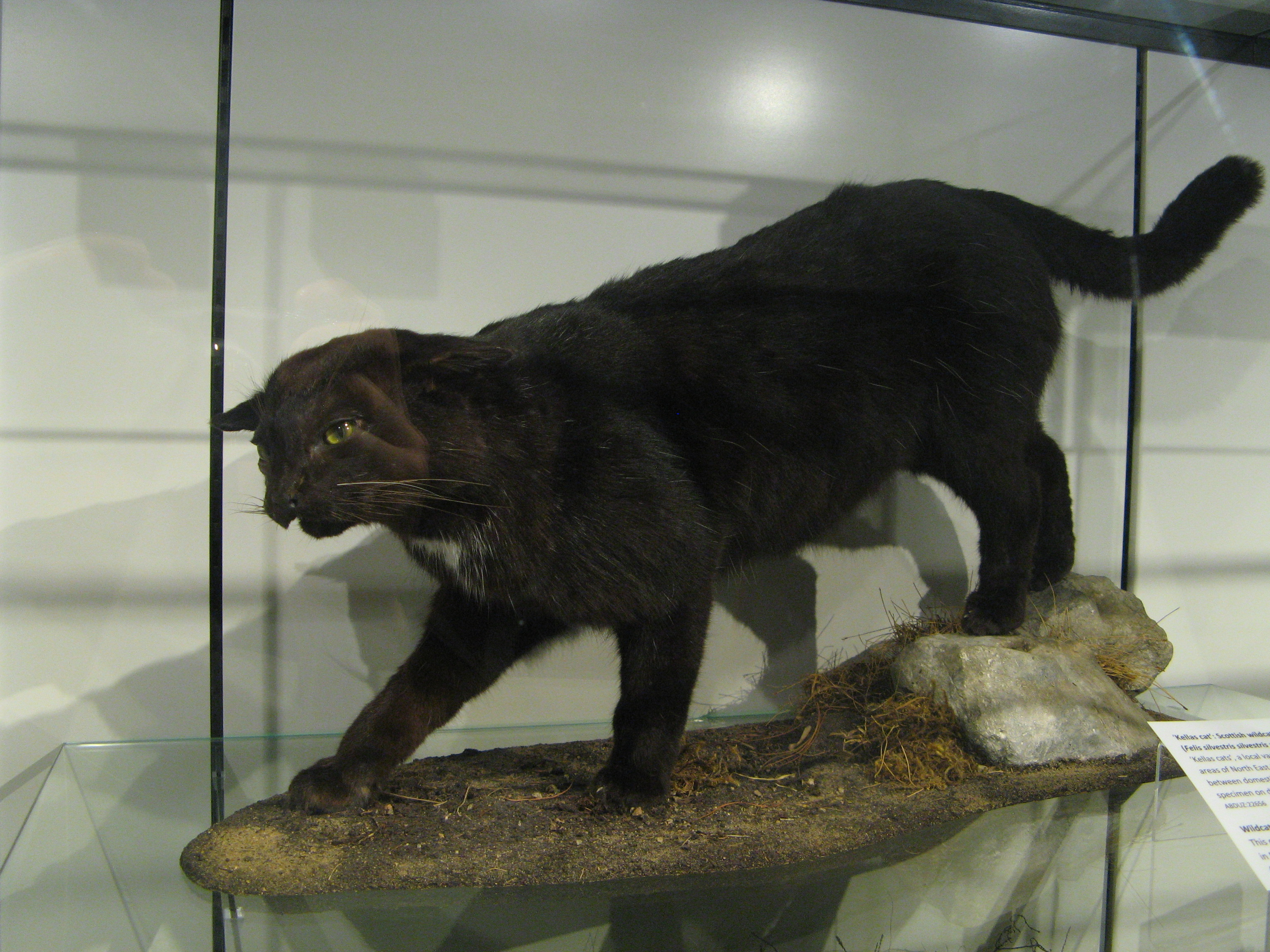
- Mounted zoological specimen of a Kellas cat

Scientific classification
- Kingdom: Animalia
- Phylum: Chordata
- Class: Mammalia
- Order: Carnivora
- Family: Felidae
- Subfamily: Felinae
- Genus: Felis
- Species: F. silvestris silvestris × F. catus

= Kellas cat =

Cross between Scottish wildcat and domestic cat

The Kellas cat is a large black cat found in Scotland. This species is an interspecific hybrid between the Scottish wildcat (Felis silvestris silvestris syn. Felis silvestris grampia) and a feral housecat (Felis catus). Once thought to be a mythological wild cat, with their few sightings dismissed as hoaxes, one was killed in a snare by a gamekeeper in 1984. They are not a formal cat breed, but a population of felid hybrids. The species is named after the village of Kellas, Moray, where they were first found.

== Specimens, examination, and captive breeding ==
The "dog-size" animal snared in 1984 was 38 centimetres (15 inches) to shoulder height and measured 110 cm (43 in) from nose to tail. When this find was reported, "[f]armers and gamekeepers responded immediately with claims that they had been shooting large black cats on Highland estates for years." Skeptics initially dismissed the animal as "a very large feral domestic cat".

A researcher at the National Museum of Scotland, Charles Thomas, examined eight Kellas cat specimens. One carcass was already in the museum's collection; the remaining seven were supplied by Di Francis, who was described by Thomas as a "writer, researcher and practical naturalist". Thomas identified one of the animals as a melanistic wildcat; this juvenile male was the first wildcat ever documented as melanistic in Scotland. Most of the other specimens examined were concluded to be hybrids but more closely aligned to the Scottish wildcat; only one hybrid leaned more towards a domestic cat.

The purported first live Kellas cat, a female, was caught at the Kellas estate by the Tomorrow's World team and featured in the 1986 episode "On the Trail of the Big Cat". A second, male, was captured in 1988 in Inverness-shire. Both were kept for a time in the Highland Wildlife Park at Kincraig, then eventually taken on by Francis; she found them untameable but successfully bred them, producing the first litter of captive-born Kellas kittens.

The Zoology Museum of the University of Aberdeen also holds a mounted specimen that was found during 2002 in the Insch area of Aberdeenshire. Another specimen is kept in a museum in Elgin.

== Distinction from other alleged cats in Britain ==
In 1988, in Dufftown, Moray, another wildcat-sized black animal was trapped and killed, and upon examination has been suggested to be a different species entirely, for having a very different skull structure, which is narrower and elongated, with a notably smaller brainpan, and unusual dentition.

Media reports about the Kellas cat in the 1980s often confused them, despite being not much larger than a house cat, with purported sightings throughout Britain of leopard-sized or larger creatures, sometimes said to be black, tawny, or striped, and blamed for various livestock killings. While a single puma, that had escaped or been released from captivity as an exotic pet, was captured humanely in 1980 in Cannich, Inverness-shire, the remainder of such alleged great cats in Britain have proved to be elusive and dubious cryptids, generally regarded as urban legend.

== Cat-sìth legend ==
The folklore of the cat-sìth ('fairy cat') may have been inspired by the Kellas cat. The cat-sìth is a fairy creature from Celtic mythology, said to resemble a large black cat with a white spot on their chest. Legend has it that the ghostly cat haunts the Scottish Highlands. The legends surrounding this creature are more common in Scottish mythology, but a few occur in Irish mythology.

The historian Charles Thomas speculated that the Pictish stone at Golspie may depict a Kellas cat. The Golspie stone, now held at the Dunrobin Castle Museum, shows a cat-like creature standing on top of a salmon, which may allude to the characteristics ascribed to a Kellas cat of catching fish while swimming in the river.

== See also ==
- British big cats
- Phantom cat
