= The Brutalist Bricks =

Studio album by Ted Leo and the Pharmacists
- Released: March 9, 2010
- Recorded: 2009
- Studio: Seaside Lounge (Brooklyn, New York); Radium City (Wakefield, Rhode Island)
- Genre: Art punk, punk rock, indie rock
- Length: 41:48
- Label: Matador
- Producer: Phil Palazzolo; Christina Picciano

Ted Leo and the Pharmacists chronology
Living with the Living (2007)	The Brutalist Bricks (2010)

Singles from The Brutalist Bricks
- 1. "Even Heroes Have to Die" Released: November 30, 2009; 2. "The Mighty Sparrow" Released: February 16, 2010; 3. "Bottled in Cork" Released: June 1, 2010

The Brutalist Bricks is the sixth album by the northeast American punk band Ted Leo and the Pharmacists. It was released March 9, 2010 by Matador Records, their first for the label.

The album received a nod from Exclaim! as the number three Punk Album of 2010.

== Promotion ==
On December 16, 2009, Matador announced a 15-city United States tour to promote The Brutalist Bricks ahead of its release, starting on March 11, 2010 at Cleveland's Grog Shop and finishing on April 10 at Boston's Paradise Rock Club. On March 31, the band announced new tour dates to further promote the album, beginning on April 2 at New Orleans' One Eyed Jacks venue and ending on July 11 at the Forecastle Festival, all while supporting American rock band the Screaming Females.

== Critical reception ==
Professional ratings
Review scores
Source	Rating
AllMusic	3.5/5 stars
Pitchfork	7.9/10
Slant Magazine	3.5/5 stars
Spin	3.5/5 stars

AllMusic writer Tim Sendra praised Leo and his band for crafting "a batch of consistently strong power pop-influenced, punk-tinged rock & roll songs" throughout the album, highlighting Leo's "delivery and total commitment" to "typically knotty and sometimes hard-to-decode lyrics" and the band having a "deep and rich" rhythm section and interesting "sonic touches (handclaps, organ, sirens, sound effects)", concluding that: "In many, if not most, artist's case, making the same record again and again would be seen as a fault. In Leo's case, it's somehow comforting that every few years he'll be along to inspire and cajole his fans with his dedication and passion. The Brutalist Bricks will let no one down in that regard." Luke Winkie of Slant Magazine felt the record was "peculiarly fresh" even with its "obvious ingredients and well-worn criterion" from previous projects, concluding that "after a three-year break following 2007's (slightly underwhelming) Living with the Living, it seems as good a time as ever for a new Leo album, even if all it does it simply reaffirm him as one of indie's most prolific and continually passionate treasures." Pitchfork contributor Paul Thompson found the album to be an improvement over Living with the Living, noting the shorten runtime, an array of "tauter, better tunes" and the band providing a "solid backbone" to them. He critiqued that Leo's lyrics came across like "sandwich-board fodder" with its blunt obtuseness, but concluded that "you hit play on Brutalist Bricks and these things seem, at best, like secondary concerns; weak spots and strained metaphors aside, the passionate, instinctual Bricks is the finest record from one of the greats in six rocky years." Joe Gross of Spin wrote: "Leo has now produced more Pharmacists records while we've been at war than not, and in a world that still needs Fugazi's oppositional fire, The Brutalist Bricks' Dischordant burn is welcome."

== Track listing ==
All tracks are written by Ted Leo.

The Brutalist Bricks track listing
No.	Title	Length
1.	"The Mighty Sparrow"	2:37
2.	"Mourning in America"	2:59
3.	"Ativan Eyes"	4:22
4.	"Even Heroes Have to Die"	3:46
5.	"The Stick"	1:57
6.	"Bottled in Cork"	3:18
7.	"Woke Up Near Chelsea"	3:51
8.	"One Polaroid a Day"	4:10
9.	"Where Was My Brain?"	2:19
10.	"Bartolomeo and the Buzzing of Bees"	3:21
11.	"Tuberculoids Arrive in Hop"	2:26
12.	"Gimme the Wire"	2:55
13.	"Last Days"	3:47

iTunes exclusive bonus track
No.	Title	Length
14.	"Everything Gets Interrupted"	2:39

== Personnel ==
Credits adapted from the album's liner notes.

- Ted Leo – guitar, vocals, mixing
- James Canty – guitar
- Marty Key – bass
- Chris Wilson – drums
- Phil Palazzolo – mixing
- Tim O'Heir – remixing (1, 4, 10)
- Greg Calbi – mastering (Sterling Sound)
- Shawn Brackbill – album photos

== Charts ==
Chart	Peak position
US Billboard 200	114
US Independent Albums	11
