= Hearts of Oak (album) =

2003 album by Ted Leo and the Pharmacists

Studio album by Ted Leo and the Pharmacists
- Released: February 11, 2003
- Recorded: September 2002
- Genres: Indie rock; punk rock; pop-punk
- Length: 54:39
- Label: Lookout!
- Producers: Ted Leo, Nicolas Vernhes

Ted Leo and the Pharmacists chronology
| The Tyranny of Distance (2001) | Hearts of Oak (2003) | Shake the Sheets (2004) |

Singles from Hearts of Oak
- 1. "Where Have All the Rude Boys Gone?" Released: September 2002

Hearts of Oak is the third studio album by American indie rock band Ted Leo and the Pharmacists, released on February 11, 2003 by Lookout! Records. A music video was filmed for the single "Where Have All the Rude Boys Gone?".

It was ranked 59th by the online magazine Pitchfork on the list of the 200 albums of the decade.

== Critical reception ==
Professional ratings
Aggregate scores
| Source | Rating |
|---|---|
| Metacritic | 84/100 |
Review scores
| Source | Rating |
| AllMusic | 4/5 stars |
| Alternative Press | 5/5 |
| The Austin Chronicle | 4/5 stars |
| Entertainment Weekly | B+ |
| Mojo | 3/5 stars |
| NME | 8/10 |
| Pitchfork | 8.3/10 |
| Rolling Stone | 3/5 stars |
| Spin | 9/10 |
| The Village Voice | B |

Hearts of Oak garnered universal acclaim from music critics highlighting Leo's musicianship in terms of lyrical content, instrumentation and vocal performance. At Metacritic, which assigns a normalized rating out of 100 to reviews from mainstream critics, the album received an average score of 84, based on 17 reviews.

Tim Sendra of AllMusic found the album a great follow-up to The Tyranny of Distance, praising the controlled stew of different rock genres used throughout and Leo for having an ear for tight musicianship and vocal range, concluding that "Hearts of Oak is a powerful and emotional record that you simply must own. Between this and The Tyranny of Distance, you are looking at a legend in the making." Jason Jackowiak of Splendid also praised Leo for having a vast musical landscape throughout the album to craft tracks with quality songwriting and instrumentation reminiscent of Thin Lizzy, Elvis Costello and early-Nick Lowe, concluding that "With a dynamic vengeance and a Celtic tune in his heart, Ted Leo might not be the answer to all the music world's problems. Still, it's certainly a pleasure to wind up Hearts of Oak and watch him go-go-go." Chris Ryan of Spin praised Leo for constructing a consistently sounding band that can conjure elements of Thin Lizzy and Dexy's Midnight Runners combined and put focus on his vocal abilities, saying that "Whether or not Leo remains contextually confined to the so-called indie slums, his horizon reaches far beyond the basement." Jon Caramanica of Entertainment Weekly praised Leo's storytelling ability for being able to create political tales with a pop sensibility to them, saying that "It’s been some time since punk was a viable storytelling genre, but Jersey’s Ted Leo turns gasping, insistent vocals into narratives that are political and pop, never compromising one for the other." Matt Gonzales of PopMatters said that despite some lyrical content feeling too idiosyncratic and obscure with its references, he praised Leo for going head-first against himself and worldwide topical problems with his musically symmetrical band, saying that "Hearts of Oak is an informal message that couldn’t have come at a more fitting time. Leo furiously delineates the dilemma of being a well-educated, well-intentioned American in a time when intelligent skepticism is regarded as sedition. In so passionately revealing his fears and doubts about the world and himself, he reminds us of rock’s power to make everything alright, or as close to alright as it’s gonna get."

In 2004, Spin placed Hearts of Oak at number 14 on its list of the 40 best albums of the year 2003. Spin writer Andrew Beaujon said, "The David Mamet of indie rock, Ted Leo packs his taut punk songs with words, words, words. Words that, strictly speaking don't belong in rock, like abjure or ossify […] And despite all these words, he rocks—a skill that Mamet has never mastered. In 2009, Pitchfork ranked the album number 59 on its list of the Top 200 Albums of the 2000s. Pitchfork writer Joshua Love said that "Hearts of Oak is Ted's finest hour, packed to the gills not only with fierce, hyper-intelligent agitprop ("The Ballad of the Sin Eater" shaming Ugly Americans for all eternity), but also combustibly catchy pop-punk hooks."

== Track listing ==
All lyrics are written by Ted Leo.

| No. | Title | Length |
|---|---|---|
| 1. | "Building Skyscrapers in the Basement" | 1:38 |
| 2. | "Where Have All the Rude Boys Gone?" | 5:02 |
| 3. | "I'm a Ghost" | 4:27 |
| 4. | "The High Party" | 4:53 |
| 5. | "Hearts of Oak" | 5:38 |
| 6. | "The Ballad of the Sin Eater" | 5:20 |
| 7. | "Dead Voices" | 3:43 |
| 8. | "The Anointed One" | 4:10 |
| 9. | "Bridges, Squares" | 4:47 |
| 10. | "Tell Balgeary, Balgury Is Dead" | 4:09 |
| 11. | "2nd Ave, 11AM" | 3:32 |
| 12. | "First to Finish, Last to Start" | 1:54 |
| 13. | "The Crane Takes Flight" | 5:28 |

== Personnel ==
- Ted Leo – guitar, organ, melodica, percussion, whistle, clapping, lead vocals
- Dorien Garry – electric piano, organ, background vocals
- David Lerner – bass
- Chris Wilson – drums
- Danny Leo – drums (1)
- Ida Pearle – violin, whistle, clapping
- Jodi Buonanno – clapping, whistle, background vocals
- Chris Leo – clapping, whistle, background vocals
- Tiffany Anders – backing vocals
- Kim Thompson - backing vocals
- Amy Leo - whistling, clapping
- Chris Leo - backing vocals, whistling, clapping, lead guitar (12)
- Eric Brunulf - whistling, clapping
- Pat Graham - whistling, clapping, photography
- Nicolas Vernhes - producer, recording engineer
- Samara Lubelski - recording assistant
- John Gordon - mastering engineer
- Tim Wright - whistling, clapping
- Pete Kerlin - photography
