= The Concubine (band) =

American deathcore band

- Origin: Tabernacle Township, NJ, U.S.A.
- Genres: Deathcore; Technical death metal
- Years active: 2003–2009
- Label: Corrosive Recordings
- Members: Kyle Smith (guitar); Dave Stahl (vocals); Dan Pilla (guitar); Jeff Herron (bass); Matt "Wolfpounder" Digise (drums)
- Past members: Mat Olivo (vocals); Steve Clifford (drums); Lou Cuello (Guitar); Brad Thron (Bass)

The Concubine was a deathcore band from Tabernacle Township, New Jersey. Formed in 2003, they toured with Knife the Glitter, Veil of Maya, Left to Vanish and other similar bands, and were hailed on metal blogs as an up-and-coming metal band.

The group made their recording debut with the 2004 EP Maestro, If You Will. Their first full-length album, Abaddon, received mixed reviews.

According to the band's Myspace, The Concubine has disbanded, citing "other interests and careers" as the reason for the break-up.
