= A Shared History of Tragedy =

Studio album by The Black Maria
- Released: September 5, 2006
- Genre: Alternative rock
- Label: Victory
- Producer: Mike Green

The Black Maria chronology
Lead Us to Reason (2005)	A Shared History of Tragedy (2006)

Professional ratings
Review scores
Source	Rating
AllMusic	3.5/5 stars

A Shared History of Tragedy is the second and final album from Canadian rock band The Black Maria.

== Track listing ==
1. "The Perilous Curse" – 3:50
2. "Waking Up with Wolves" – 3:46
3. "Nothing Comes Easy But You" – 3:26
4. "Van Gogh" – 3:41
5. "A Call to Arms" – 3:36
6. "Lucid" – 3:31
7. "The Concubine" – 4:05
8. "Living Expenses" – 4:38
9. "Fool's Gold" – 2:49
10. "A Thief in the Ranks (Your Bike)" – 5:32
11. "11:11" – 3:20
