= Ted Leo and the Pharmacists =

American rock band

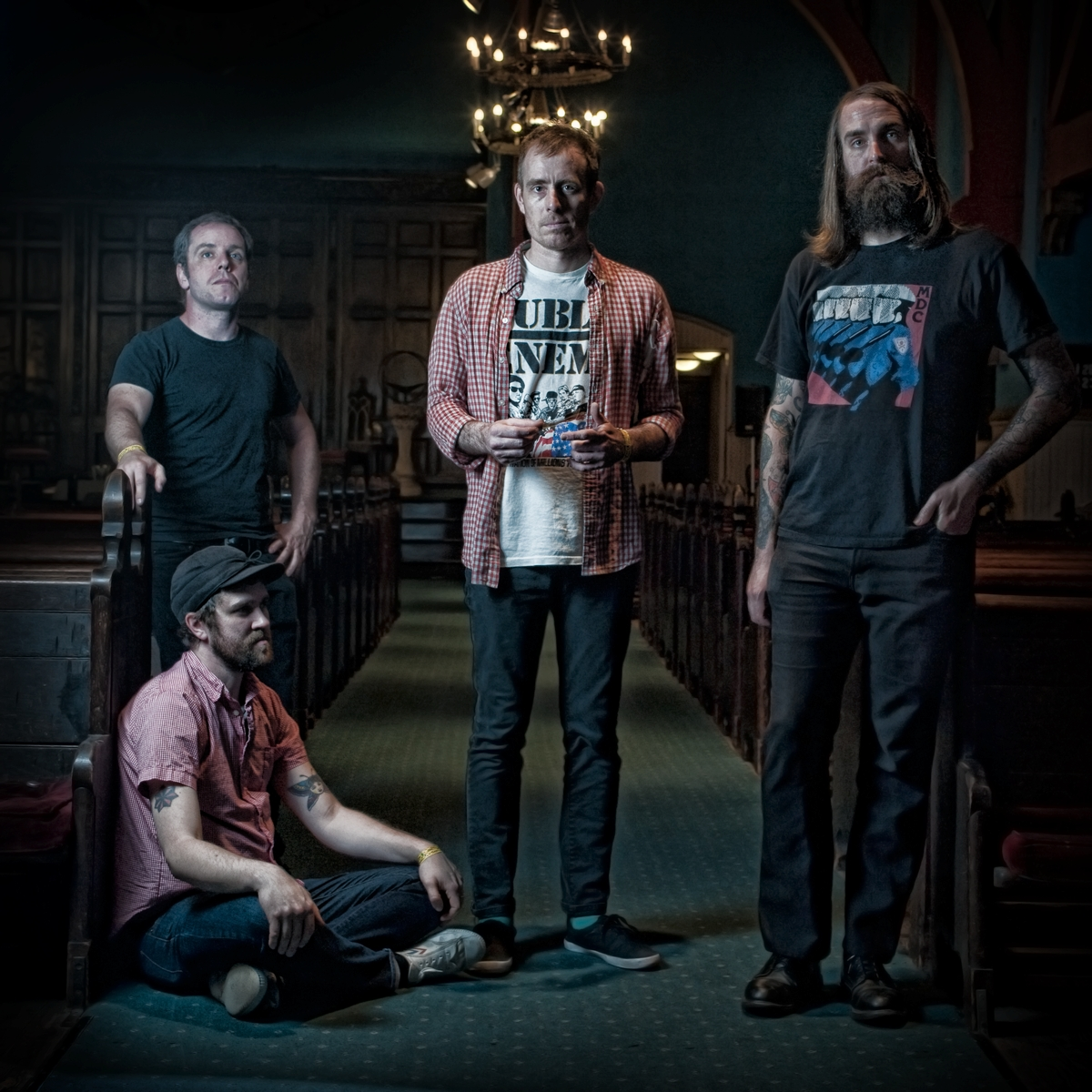

Background information
- Origin: Washington, D.C.
- Genres: Punk rock, indie rock, art punk
- Years active: 1999–present
- Labels: Gern Blandsten, Ace Fu, Lookout!, Touch and Go, Matador
- Members: Ted Leo; James Canty; Chris Wilson; Marty Key; Adrian CN Berry; Ralph Darden
- Past members: Jodi Buonanno; Amy Farina; Dorien Garry; Dave Lerner
- Website: www.tedleo.com

Ted Leo and the Pharmacists (sometimes written Ted Leo/Pharmacists, Ted Leo + Pharmacists, or shortened to TL/Rx) are an American rock band formed in 1999 in Washington, D.C. They have released six full-length studio albums and have toured internationally. Though the group's lineup has fluctuated throughout their career, singer/guitarist Ted Leo has remained the band's main songwriter, creative force, and only constant member. The group's music combines elements of punk rock, indie rock, art punk, traditional rock, and occasionally folk music and dub reggae.

== History ==
=== 1999–2001: Formation and first releases ===
Ted Leo's previous band, Chisel, had broken up in 1997 after internal struggles with both a direction to go and Leo's bounding depression. After the breakup, Ted spent time producing and working on albums for the Spinanes, the Secret Stars, and Jejune. He also fronted the Sin Eaters, a short-lived band featuring members of the Van Pelt and Native Nod. After these projects either finished or fizzled out, Leo started playing solo. In 1999, he recorded and released tej leo(?), Rx / pharmacists, a solo effort which was highly experimental and mixed elements of punk rock, reggae, dub, and audio experimentation.

In 2000, Leo expanded the project to a full band including James Canty on guitar, Jodi Buonanno on bass and Amy Farina on drums. He named the backing band the Pharmacists, and the group released the EP Treble in Trouble. The EP moved away from many of the experimental elements of tej leo by relying on more traditional rock structures and instrumentation, though it still explored some non-traditional characteristics.

=== 2001–2005: Lookout! Records, Hearts of Oak, and Shake the Sheets ===
The band signed to Lookout! Records in 2001 and experienced more lineup changes as Buonanno and Farina left the group. For the album The Tyranny of Distance, Leo and Canty utilized a number of in-studio backing musicians. The album incorporated multiple styles including Celtic rock, acoustic folk balladry and pop rock. During the supporting tours for the album, bassist Dave Lerner, drummer Chris Wilson, and keyboardist Dorien Garry became permanent members. The group's next album, 2003's Hearts of Oak, drew from punk rock and new wave influences. The EP Tell Balgeary, Balgury Is Dead soon followed and featured a number of Leo's solo songs and covers. A video documentary of the band performing at the 2003 Siren Music Festival in Coney Island, Dirty Old Town, was released in early 2004 by Plexifilm.

Prior to the recording of 2004's Shake the Sheets, Garry and Canty left the band, reducing the group to a trio. The album explored social and political topics and experienced some success with the single "Me and Mia". The iTunes-exclusive EP Sharkbite Sessions followed in 2005.

=== 2006-present: Touch and Go Records, Living with the Living, and The Brutalist Bricks ===
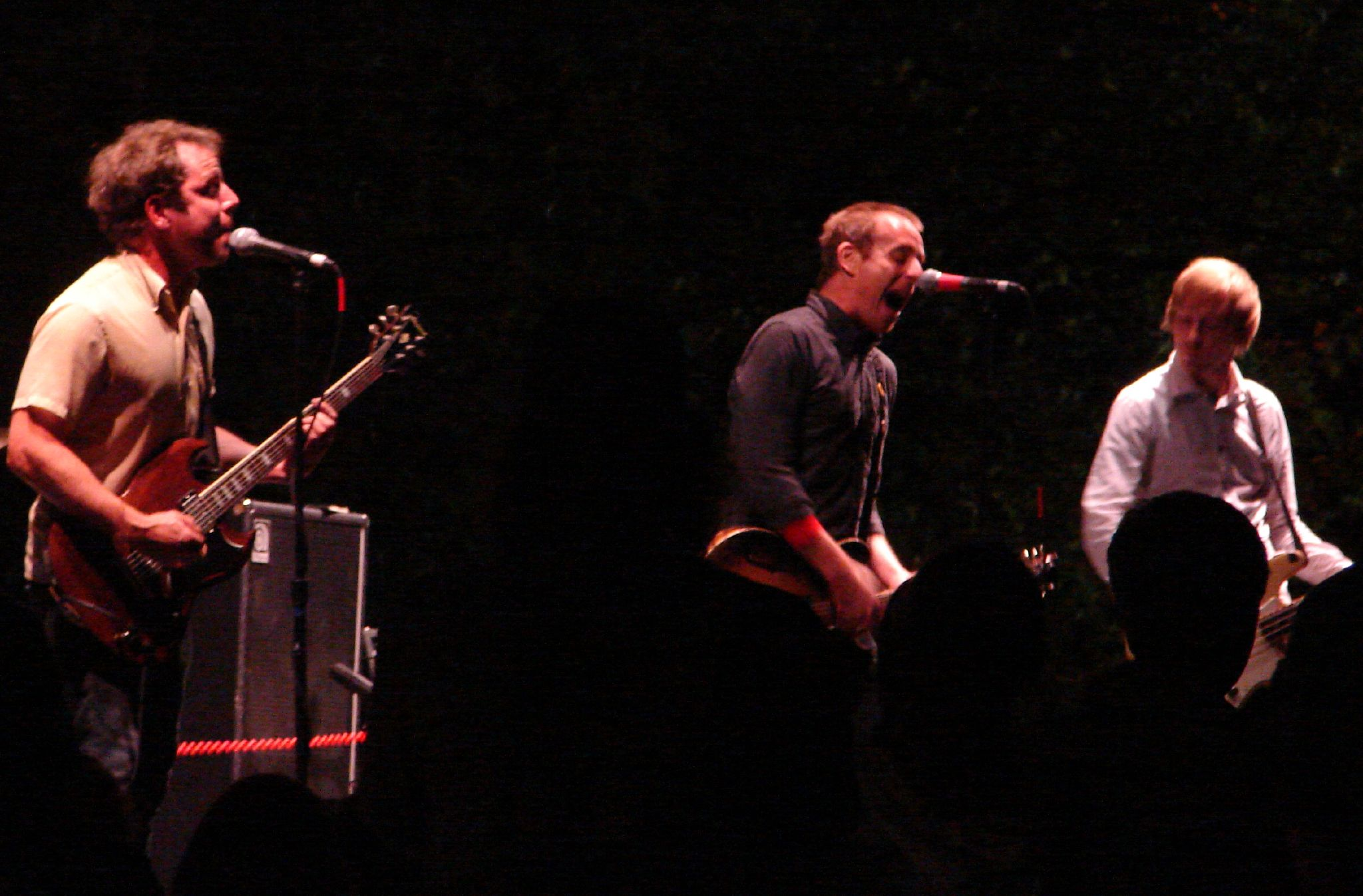
Ted Leo and the Pharmacists performing at the Bumbershoot festival in Seattle in 2007.

In 2006, Ted Leo and the Pharmacists left Lookout! amidst financial crises within the label, and signed a new contract with Chicago-based Touch and Go Records. The band's popularity continued to expand through constant touring and performances at large festivals such as the Coachella Valley Music and Arts Festival and the Pitchfork Music Festival. Their fourth full-band album, Living with the Living, was released on March 20, 2007. First-run copies of the album also included the Mo' Living EP. Canty rejoined them for touring in support of Living with the Living.

Bassist Lerner played his last show with the band at McCarren Park Pool in Brooklyn, NY on August 12, 2007. Marty "Violence" Key, formerly of the (Young) Pioneers, replaced him on tour. In April 2008, the band recorded a performance for the Beautiful Noise concert series in Toronto. They then performed as openers for six dates of Pearl Jam's 2008 U.S. tour in June.

They toured with Against Me! and Future of the Left in September and October 2008.

On September 15, 2008, the band released a surprise digital EP, Rapid Response, in response to the violence at the 2008 Republican National Convention in St. Paul, Minnesota. The EP was made available on the Touch and Go website for a choice of prices with all proceeds going to Democracy Now! and Food Not Bombs of St. Paul.

The Pharmacists' most recent album, The Brutalist Bricks, was released on March 9, 2010, followed by a tour of the United States and Europe. In September 2011, Key left the band to open a record store. The band continued as a trio with Canty taking over on bass.

In a 2012 interview, Leo alluded to a new album to be released that summer, which has yet to be issued. In 2017, Leo released The Hanged Man under his own name after funding it through a Kickstarter campaign.

On March 4, 2022, Leo released an EP titled Andy, Come Out on his Bandcamp, featuring two new songs and a cover of the song "Ping Pong" by Stereolab that Leo had played live the night before. This was followed up by The Old 200 EP a month later. He sporadically put out more EPs throughout the rest of the year, all credited under the Pharmacists name.

On February 13, 2024, Leo announced the Pharmacists would be going on a US tour in celebration of the 20th anniversary of Shake The Sheets with opening support from Ekko Astral and Diners.

== Band members ==
Ted Leo and the Pharmacists lineups (only official members listed)
(1999–2000) tej leo(?), Rx / pharmacists	Ted Leo – vocals, instrumentation; Jodi V.B. – collaboration
(2000–2001) Treble in Trouble	Ted Leo – vocals, guitar; James Canty – guitar; Jodi V.B. – bass; Amy Farina – drums
(2001–2002) The Tyranny of Distance	Ted Leo – vocals, guitar; James Canty – guitar; Pete Kerlin, Alex Minoff – bass; Brendan Canty, James Canty, Danny Leo, Ted Leo, Seb Thompson – drums
(2002–2004) Hearts of Oak Tell Balgeary, Balgury Is Dead	Ted Leo – vocals, guitar; James Canty – guitar; Dave Lerner – bass; Dorien Garry – keyboards; Chris Wilson – drums
(2004–2007) Shake the Sheets Sharkbite Sessions Living with the Living Mo' Living	Ted Leo – vocals, guitar; Dave Lerner – bass; Chris Wilson – drums
(2007) live shows only	Ted Leo – vocals, guitar; James Canty – guitar; Dave Lerner – bass; Chris Wilson – drums
(2007–2011) The Brutalist Bricks	Ted Leo – vocals, guitar; James Canty – guitar; Marty Key – bass; Chris Wilson – drums

=== Current members ===
- Ted Leo – vocals, guitar, piano (1999–present)
- James Canty – guitar, keyboards, backing vocals (2000–present)
- Chris Wilson – drums (2002–present)
- Marty Key – bass, backing vocals (2007–present)
- Adrian CN Berry – saxophone, percussion, keyboards, backing vocals (2017–2019, Hearts of Oak 15 and The Hanged Man tours)
- Ralph Darden – guitar, backing vocals

=== Past members ===
- Jodi V.B. – bass (1999–2001)
- Amy Farina – drums (2000–2001)
- Pete Kerlin – bass (2001)
- Alex Minoff – bass (2002)
- Dorien Garry – keyboards (2002–2004)
- Dave Lerner – bass, backing vocals (2002–2007)

== Discography ==
=== Studio albums ===
Year	Title	Label	Format	Other information
1999	tej leo(?), Rx / pharmacists	Gern Blandsten Records	CD	Technically the first Ted Leo and the Pharmacists album, though it is a Ted Leo solo recording
2001	The Tyranny of Distance	Lookout! Records	CD/LP	First album as a full band
2003	Hearts of Oak	Lookout! Records	CD/LP	
2004	Shake the Sheets	Lookout! Records	CD/LP	
2007	Living with the Living	Touch and Go Records	CD/LP	
2010	The Brutalist Bricks	Matador Records	CD/LP/digital	
2010	The Brutalist Bricks	La Castanya	LP/CD	Licensed from Matador for Spain and Portugal. Colored vinyl and CD including the bonus track "One Polaroid a Day (Remix – Featuring Rebecca Gates)"
2017	The Hanged Man	self-released	CD/LP/digital	Credited to Ted Leo with contributions from members of the Pharmacists

=== EPs ===
Year	Title	Label	Format	Other information
1999	Guitar for Jodi	Persona Records	7"	Features demo version of "The Great Communicator"
2000	Treble in Trouble	Ace Fu Records	CD	First release as a full band
2003	Tell Balgeary, Balgury Is Dead	Lookout! Records	CD	Single from Hearts of Oak backed with nine Leo solo songs and covers
2005	Split with Blueline Medic	Casadeldisco Records	EP	
2005	Sharkbite Sessions	iTunes	digital	iTunes-exclusive downloadable EP
2007	Mo' Living	Touch and Go Records	CD	Bonus EP included with first run pressings of Living with the Living
2008	Rapid Response	Touch and Go Records	digital	Digital exclusive
2022	Andy, Come Out	Self-released	digital	Released on Ted's Bandcamp page, attributed to Ted Leo & The Pharmacists
2022	The Old 200	Self-released	digital	Same as above
2023	Heaven's Off	Self-released	digital	
2023	August 2023 Bandcamp EP	Self-released	digital	

=== Singles ===
Year	Title	Label	Format	Other information
1999	Split with One AM Radio	Garbage Czar Records	7"	Two tracks: "The Latest Dart" and a cover of Lungfish's "To Whom You Were Born". Re-released in 2003 on CD by Translucence Records.
2002	Split with Karla from Ida and Beekeeper	Tigerstyle Records	7"	One track: "Bridges, Squares (Bilbao to Glasgow)"
2008	Split with Zach Galifianakis	Chunklet Magazine	7"	One track: "Rock'n'Roll Dreams'll Come Through"
2010	"The Oldest House"	Matador Records	7"	Two tracks: "The Oldest House" and "North Coast"; Record Store Day release
2010	"Bottled in Cork"	Matador Records	digital	Two tracks: "Bottled in Cork" and "Bottled in Cork (Demo Version)"

=== Non-album tracks ===
Year	Title	Label	Song(s)	Other information
2000	Transmission One: Tea at the Palaz of Hoon	Cosmodemonic Telegraph Records	"You Always Hate the One You Love"	
2002	Don't Know When I'll Be Back Again	Exotic Fever Records	"Many Rivers to Cross"	Jimmy Cliff cover
2009	Score! 20 Years of Merge Records: The Covers!	Merge Records	"The Numbered Head"	Robert Pollard cover
2013	La Castanya 5	La Castanya	"La Costa Brava (Versió Català)"	New recording with lyrics in Catalan of the song "La Costa Brava"

== Videography ==
=== Music videos ===
Year	Title	Album
2003	"Where Have All the Rude Boys Gone?"	Hearts of Oak
2004	"Me and Mia"	Shake the Sheets
2007	"Bomb. Repeat. Bomb."	Living with the Living
2007	"Colleen"	Living with the Living
2010	"The Mighty Sparrow"	The Brutalist Bricks
2010	"Bottled in Cork"	The Brutalist Bricks

=== Video releases ===
Year	Title	Label	Format
2004	Dirty Old Town	Plexifilm	DVD
