= Living with the Living =

Studio album by Ted Leo and the Pharmacists
- Released: March 20, 2007
- Recorded: September–October 2006
- Genre: Art punk, punk rock, indie rock
- Length: 61:07
- Label: Touch and Go
- Producer: Brendan Canty

Ted Leo and the Pharmacists chronology
Shake the Sheets (2004)	Living with the Living (2007)	The Brutalist Bricks (2010)

Living with the Living is the fifth album by the Washington, D.C., rock band Ted Leo and the Pharmacists, released in 2007 by Touch and Go Records. It was the band's first album for the Touch and Go label and debuted on the U.S. Billboard 200 at number 109, selling about 8,000 copies in its first week. Music videos were filmed for the singles "Bomb. Repeat. Bomb." and "Colleen". The iTunes download version of the album included a bonus track entitled "The Vain Parade", while first-run copies of the CD version included the bonus Mo' Living EP.

== Critical reception ==
Professional ratings
Review scores
Source	Rating
AllMusic	3.5/5 stars
Aversion	5/5 stars
No Ripcord	5/10
Pitchfork	7.5/10
Rolling Stone	3/5 stars

Corey Apar from AllMusic praised Leo's overall musicianship for remaining consistent alongside his previous works in terms of emotional resonance and politically minded savviness but was hoping for something a little more extraordinary that showed Leo pushing further from his comfort zone. Rolling Stone's Christian Hoard noted the "unusually spry riddims" Leo uses when delivering his political lyricism but felt it lacked memorability. Gabbie Nirenburg, writing for No Ripcord, said about the record, "[T]he songs are flat and unoriginal rock. Ted's voice and vocal range is exemplary, but it's the only real star on this record. Nothing sticks the way it should. Perhaps it's a bigger blow to my system because I've come to expect such greatness from Ted Leo."

== Track listing ==
All lyrics are written by Ted Leo.

No.	Title	Length
1.	"Fourth World War"	0:35
2.	"The Sons of Cain"	3:59
3.	"Army Bound"	3:11
4.	"Who Do You Love?"	4:14
5.	"Colleen"	3:05
6.	"A Bottle of Buckie"	3:11
7.	"Bomb.Repeat.Bomb."	3:18
8.	"La Costa Brava"	5:56
9.	"Annunciation Day/Born on Christmas Day"	1:33
10.	"The Unwanted Things"	4:33
11.	"The Lost Brigade"	7:28
12.	"The World Stops Turning"	3:26
13.	"Some Beginner's Mind"	3:50
14.	"The Toro and the Toreador"	6:09
15.	"C.I.A."	6:33

iTunes bonus track
No.	Title	Length
16.	"The Vain Parade"	6:28

== Personnel ==
- Ted Leo – guitar, vocals, other instrumentation
- Dave Lerner – bass
- Chris Wilson – drums

== Album information ==
- Record label: Touch and Go Records
- Recorded September 24, 2006 – October 5, 2006, at Longview Farms in North Brookfield, Massachusetts with engineering by Ian Neill, and October 8, 2006 – October 14, 2006, at Blind Spot Studios in Washington, D.C., with engineering by Brendan Canty
- Mixed October 15, 2006 – October 22, 2006, at Blind Spot Studios in Washington, D.C., by Ted Leo and Brendan Canty
- Mastered November 28, 2006, at SAE Studios in Phoenix, Arizona by Roger Seibel
- Design by Jodi V.B. and Ida Pearle
- Photography by Shawn Brackbill
