= Plexifilm =

- Type: Film distributor and production company
- Industry: Motion pictures
- Founder: Gary Hustwit; Sean Anderson
- Headquarters: United States

Plexifilm was an independent DVD label and film production company co-founded by Gary Hustwit (formerly VP of Salon.com) and Sean Anderson (formerly Director of DVD Development of The Criterion Collection) in 2001. Plexifilm produced original films, released films theatrically, and produced, distributed and marketed DVDs.

== Controversy ==
In late 2008, after the band Wilco heard of Plexifilm's interest in releasing a Blu-ray version of the Sam Jones documentary I Am Trying to Break Your Heart: A Film About Wilco, the band urged fans in emails and on television appearances to not buy the new version. Wilco's stance was that the cost does not substantiate any gained value for the money to their fans. Plexifilm responded on their website that the quality of the transfer to Blu-ray is beneficial. As of January 2024, I Am Trying to Break Your Heart has not had an official Blu-ray release.

== Releases ==
- ODDSAC by Animal Collective & Danny Perez (2010)
- Objectified by Gary Hustwit (2009)
- Wild Combination: A Portrait of Arthur Russell by Matt Wolf (2008)
- You Think You Really Know Me: The Gary Wilson Story by Michael Wolk (2008)
- Helvetica by Gary Hustwit (2007)
- Wasted Orient by Kevin Fritz (2007)
- High Tech Soul by Gary Bredow (2006)
- We Jam Econo: The Story of the Minutemen by Tim Irwin and Keith Schieron (2006)
- Kill the Moonlight by Stephen Hanft (2006)
- Guided by Voices: The Electrifying Conclusion by Matt Monsoor (2005)
- Drift (2005) by Lee Ranaldo and Leah Singer (2005)
- Drive Well, Sleep Carefully – On the Road with Death Cab for Cutie by Justin Mitchell
- Spend an Evening with Saddle Creek by Jason Kulbel and Rob Walters (2005)
- Finisterre by Paul Kelly and Kieran Evans (2005)
- Made in Sheffield by Eve Wood (2005)
- Moog by Hans Fjellestad (2004)
- Low in Europe by Sebastian Schrade (2004)
- Ilé Aiyé (The House of Life) by David Byrne (2004)
- Galaxie 500 (1987-1991): Don't Let Our Youth Go To Waste (2004)
- Five Films About Christo and Jeanne-Claude a Maysles Films production(2004)
- Dirty Old Town by Justin Mitchell(2004)
- Decasia: The State of Decay by Bill Morrison (2004)
- Gigantic (A Tale of Two Johns) by A. J. Schnack (2003)
- Space Is the Place by John Coney (2003)
- Northwest by Coan Nichols & Rick Charnoski (2003)
- Hell House by George Ratliff (2003)
- I Am Trying to Break Your Heart: A Film About Wilco by Sam Jones (2003)
- Style Wars by Tony Silver & Henry Chalfant (2003)
- Friends Forever by Ben Wolfinsohn (2003)
- Mysterious Object at Noon by Apichatpong Weerasethakul (2003)
- Benjamin Smoke by Jem Cohen & Peter Sillen (2003)
- Fruit of the Vine by Coan Nichols & Rick Charnoski (2002)
- Ciao! Manhattan by John Palmer & David Weisman (2002)

== See also ==
- The Criterion Collection
- Masters of Cinema
