= Beware the Cat =

1562 satire book by William Baldwin

Beware the Cat (1561) is an English satire written by the printer's assistant and poet William Baldwin (sometimes called Gulielmus Baldwin), in early 1553. It has been claimed by some academics to be the first novel ever published in English of any kind.

== Publication history ==
The work was written in 1553, during the final months of the reign of King Edward VI, but was not published because the accession of Mary Tudor to the throne prevented it. Joseph Ritson's Bibliographia Poetica (1802) is the only authority for an edition dated 1561, which is probably an error. An edition from 1570 is now only known via a Victorian era transcript; a second 1570 edition survives only as a four-page fragment. There is also another edition, dated 1584. The work was dedicated to the courtier John Young.

The 1570 quarto edition is entitled: A MARVELOVS hystory intitulede, Beware the Cat. Conteynyng diuerse wounderfull and incredible matters. Very pleasant and mery to read. On publication in its 1570 edition it was subject to an anonymous poetic riposte of 56 lines, "A short Answere to the boke called: Beware the Cat", which rebukes the author for making fun of the narrator Master Gregory Streamer (who is not otherwise known to have really existed). Baldwin's book was published in Typographical Antiquities (1786) as a fine example of black-letter printing. It was also known in mid-Victorian times, since it was published by the Chetham Society in their volume Remains, Historical & Literary (1860). It received almost no attention from literary scholars, although William P. Holden produced an obscure edition in the original archaic English, issued from Connecticut College in 1963. A full scholarly edition only appeared in 1988 (edited by Ringler and Flachmann), after which the work has gained in popularity.

Baldwin included printed glosses in the margin beside his main text. These are sometimes simply illustrative, but at other times they satirize the narrator, Gregory Streamer, in ironic or humorous fashion.

== Plot ==
The work employs a frame narrative set at the royal court during Christmas celebrations in 1552/53. That year Baldwin was employed as an actor and entertainer under George Ferrers, Master of the King's Pastimes. Baldwin creates a character, who is also named Baldwin. He joins Ferrers, someone called "master Willot," and "Master Streamer" (i.e., Gregory Streamer) in a fictionalized debate concerning the question of whether animals possess the capacity to reason. Streamer offers to persuade his interlocutors in the affirmative, and proceeds to deliver a monologue which constitutes the rest of the book. It is divided into three sections, or "orations."

Streamer's account describes his activities while lodging at the London printing house of John Day, a prominent Tudor printer. In the first part, he recounts a fictional conversation he witnessed at that lodging between a man from Staffordshire, someone called Thomas, an anonymous third speaker, and "Master Sherry," probably a fictionalized version of the Oxford academic Richard Sherry. The first tells the group that four decades earlier he had overheard from another person that that man had heard cats report the death of a cat called Grimalkin. Thomas says that thirty-three years ago he had been in Ireland, and he repeats a peasant's tale about the same Grimalkin, who had appeared seven years before that to an Irish man and his son, who had taken refuge in a church after going raiding. After devouring a sheep and cow, the cat eats the son, and the peasant kills him and escapes. The discussion turns to a debate on whether Grimalkin was in fact a disguised witch. The third speaker objects to the reasonableness of Thomas's story, and Master Sherry, the fourth interlocutor, asserts that he believes in the existence of witches, and says that the bishop of Alexandria had found a way to understand birds.

The second part of Streamer's account describes how he heard the mewing of cats outside his window and his search for a way to gain the ability to understand the language of cats. He consults a "book of secrets" which had been attributed to the thirteenth-century philosopher Albertus Magnus, and finds there a recipe to understand birds. Streamer modifies this recipe and acquires various animal organs and body parts, including those of a hedgehog, fox, rabbit, kite, and cat. He combines these into various kinds of food and drink, and after consuming them, attains his goal.

The third portion of the work constitutes its own frame story. Streamer overhears the group of cats speaking outside his window. They have gathered to consume decaying remains of dismembered body parts of executed traitors, which have been affixed above the city gate adjacent to Streamer's lodging. In fact, the cats constitute a feline tribunal, which Streamer overhears as it is in the process of trying a case against the cat Mouseslayer, who is alleged to have violated certain feline promiscuity laws. Streamer overhears Mouseslayer's monologue to the cat-court, in which she defends her conduct and gives an account of her life's story. It is this point in his book where Baldwin includes his harshest anti-Catholic satire. Internal references reveal that Mouseslayer's account takes place between the first half of 1549 and May 1551. During this time, Protestant reformers brought change to England's religious laws, but some resisted these efforts, at least according to this satire. Mouseslayer tells how she had witnessed forbidden Catholic rituals; her story incorporates the ribald humor associated with the medieval genre of fabliaux (John N. King, Voices of the English Reformation (2004), p. 152.)

After Streamer completes his "oration", the narrative returns to Baldwin and the others at the royal court. The author-narrator delivers his "moral", a warning to "beware the cat," since cats can witness what happens behind closed doors.

Baldwin's use of dialogue is advanced for his time, the characters are clearly drawn, and the description of Tudor London is vivid. As a satire, the book is effective in criticizing religious practices which were out of favor during Edward's reign. The work also criticizes ostentatious and pompous forms of knowledge which are not based in fact. The 1584 edition of the text included a poem entitled 'T.K To the Reader' which underscores the anti-Catholic sentiment. The work is important for its sophisticated use of layered narration, its multiple narrators, and its satirical deployment of logic grounded in hearsay.

== Adaptations ==
An abridged and rewritten version in modern English by David Haden, was published in his Tales of Lovecraftian Cats (2010) along with Haden's adaptations of public domain horror stories by other authors.

A one-hour performance of Beware the Cat was performed by the Royal Shakespeare Company at The Other Place, Stratford-upon-Avon, in 2019. It was brought to life by researchers at the University of Sheffield, Sheffield Hallam and Sussex, and included artwork by Penny McCarthy. Royal Shakespeare Company Stage Adaptation (RSC article), Royal Shakespeare Company Stage Adaptation (Guardian Newspaper)

An adaptation of Beware the Cat was performed by Beyond Shakespeare during their 2023 Winter Revels at The White Bear Theatre, Kennington. Adapted and performed by Robert Crighton, it was recorded for future release on the Beyond podcast.
