= Mo' Living =

EP by Ted Leo and the Pharmacists
- Released: March 20, 2007
- Recorded: December 15, 16 & 18, 2006
- Studios: Wild Frontier Studios, Brooklyn, New York
- Genres: Rock; punk rock; indie rock
- Label: Touch and Go

Ted Leo and the Pharmacists chronology
Living with the Living (2007)	Mo' Living (2007)

Mo' Living is an EP by the Washington, D.C. rock band Ted Leo and the Pharmacists, released in 2007 by Touch and Go Records. It served as a bonus EP that was included with first run pressings of the band's album Living with the Living.

== Track listing ==
All songs written by Ted Leo except where noted.

1. "Nothing Much to Say"
2. "Old Souls Know"
3. "Living with the Living"
4. "Already Too Late?"
5. "Rappaport's Testament: I Never Gave Up" (Chumbawamba)
6. "Outro"

== Performers ==
- Ted Leo – vocals, guitar
- Dave Lerner – bass
- Chris Wilson – drums
