= The Tyranny of Distance (album) =

Studio album by Ted Leo and the Pharmacists
- Released: June 19, 2001
- Recorded: February 17–March 3, 2001
- Studios: National Recording (Washington, D.C.)
- Genre: Indie rock
- Length: 48:51
- Label: Lookout!
- Producer: Brendan Canty

Ted Leo and the Pharmacists chronology
tej leo(?), Rx / pharmacists (1999)	The Tyranny of Distance (2001)	Hearts of Oak (2003)

The Tyranny of Distance is the second album by American rock band Ted Leo and the Pharmacists, released in 2001 by Lookout! Records. It was the group's first album as a full band, as their previous album tej leo(?), Rx / pharmacists had been a solo effort by singer/guitarist Ted Leo. The album's title comes from a lyric in the Split Enz song "Six Months in a Leaky Boat", which the band later covered twice: first as a Leo solo on the EP Tell Balgeary, Balgury Is Dead in 2003, and again as a full band on 2005's Sharkbite Sessions.

== Critical reception ==
Professional ratings
Review scores
Source	Rating
AllMusic	4.5/5 stars
Pitchfork	8.5/10
Stylus Magazine	B+

Nate Cavalieri of AllMusic said about the record overall, "By fusing the punk and retro-pop elements of his musical history with a noisy affection for '60s blues-rock formulas, The Tyranny of Distance showcases some of Leo's best songwriting to date. Laden with falsetto hooks and overtly romantic observations of the world, he is able to control combinations of aggression and sentiment and focus them into highly melodic expressions of pure emotion." Pitchfork writer Chip Chanko praised the musicianship of backing band the Pharmacists and Leo's songwriting and guitar work, saying that "Ted Leo's latest offers ample hooks, a uniquely expressive voice, and a perfect single that, in a just universe, would be all over the radio. I wanted to tell the world of the album's riches! Riches of song!" Dan Cooper of Stylus Magazine was initially put off by Leo's falsetto voice but was intrigued by the music and lyrical content, saying, "If you can get past the voice, pick up the album. It won't be in your cd changer everyday, but it will be a nice keepsake for a rainy day."

In 2009, Pitchfork placed The Tyranny of Distance at number 120 on their list of the Top 200 Albums of the 2000s. Pitchfork writer Jason Crock said, "Formed in between Pharmacists lineups and aided by numerous friends in the studio, Tyranny of Distance sounds cobbled together by the pieces of a lifetime's listening while still remarkably cohesive and whole."

== Track listing ==
1. "Biomusicology" – 4:18
2. "Parallel or Together?" – 4:56
3. "Under the Hedge" – 3:20
4. "Dial Up" – 4:04
5. "Timorous Me" – 4:34
6. "Stove by a Whale" – 7:59
7. "The Great Communicator" – 3:16
8. "Squeaky Fingers" – 3:37
9. "M¥ Vien iLin" – 2:43
10. "The Gold Finch and the Red Oak Tree" – 1:54
11. "St. John the Divine" – 6:39
12. "You Could Die (Or This Might End)" – 1:30

== Personnel ==
Credits adapted from the album's booklet.

The Pharmacists

- Brendan Canty – drums (7)
- James Canty – drums (1, 4, 6)
- Amy Domingues – cello (1, 10)
- Fretless Pete Kerlin – bass (9, 11)
- Danny Leo – drums (9, 11), percussion (9)
- Fretful Alex Minoff – bass (1, 4, 5)
- Seb Thomson – drums (2, 3)
- The Pines of Nowhere – handclaps

Production

- Brendan Canty – producer
- Seb Thomson – engineer
- Alan Douches – mastering (West West Side)

Imagery

- Amy Farina, Ted Leo, Time Wright, Corey Dumais – photos
- Ida Pearle – swimmers, sea horse
