= Chisel (band) =

American punk rock band

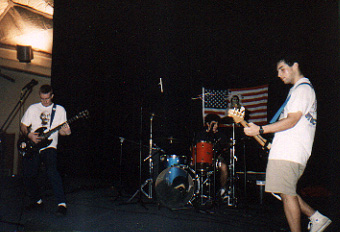
- Chisel plays on the University of Notre Dame campus, April 1991. From left, are Ted Leo, John Dugan and Chris Infante.

Background information
- Origin: University of Notre Dame, Indiana, United States
- Genres: Punk rock, indie rock, mod revival
- Years active: 1990-1997, 2023-present
- Labels: Gern Blandsten, The Numero Group
- Spinoffs: Ted Leo and the Pharmacists, Severinsen
- Members: Ted Leo; John Dugan; Chris Norborg
- Past members: Chris Infante
- Website: Official myspace website Bandcamp page

Chisel is an American punk rock band from the United States. In their original run, the group released two full-length albums and a compilation of early recordings on Gern Blandsten before disbanding in 1997. In 2022, their music began being reissued by The Numero Group. Later that year, they reunited to play the Numero Twenty festival and a series of shows around the US.

== History ==
=== 1990-1995: Formation and early years ===
Chisel began in 1990 on the campus of the University of Notre Dame, when classmates Ted Leo (guitar/vocals), Chris Infante (bass), and John Dugan (drums) began practicing in the basement of a campus dormitory. Leo played punk with Animal Crackers and Citizens Arrest in New York's all-ages scene, while Dugan drummed with Indian Summer from age 15 in Washington, D.C.'s punk scene. The band quickly went from playing a covers set (Wire, Misfits, Buzzcocks, Mission of Burma) to playing original songs written by Leo. Chisel began performing at various college venues across the Midwest and Northeast, including clubs like D.C. Space in Washington and ABC No Rio in New York City.

The band released their debut single "Swamp Fox/Spike" b/w "Listen" on Assembly Records in 1991. They followed it up with appearances on two compilations released by college radio stations WVFI in Notre Dame, Indiana, and WPRB in Princeton, New Jersey. During the same year, they produced a demo tape at Stanford Hall in Notre Dame. In 1992, Infante finished college and was replaced on bass by Chris Norborg, who also added supporting vocal harmonies. During this time, the band started to shift their style from the traditional emo-influenced pop punk that was popular among their contemporaries in Washington, D.C. to a more mod-influenced sound, similar to that of The Small Faces and The Jam. In 1994, the band members relocated to Washington where Dugan had been interning with Amnesty International.

=== 1995-1997: Nothing New and 8 A.M. All Day ===
In 1995, the band released Nothing New, a compilation released on the Gern Blandsten label. The compilation included new songs that were recorded with Guy Picciotto from Fugazi in his home studio, as well as recordings from the previous year in Chicago with Casey Rice, the soundman for Tortoise. Many of the songs from the compilation had been released as non-album singles.

It was followed in 1996 by the release of 8 A.M. All Day, their debut album, produced by the band and recorded in the basement studio of Velocity Girl guitarist Archie Moore. By now, Chisel started touring as a supporting act for bands such as Fugazi, Velocity Girl, Blonde Redhead, and Tuscadero. After releasing 8 A.M. All Day, the band started gaining a larger following in rock clubs in cities like New York, Chicago, and Boston.

=== 1997: Set You Free and breakup ===
For their next album, the band enlisted Nicolas Vernhes and his Rare Book Room studio in Williamsburg, Brooklyn to record brand new material. The band first recorded a single, "It's Alright, You're Okay", in the studio and a few months later booked Vernhes for 10 days. Within those ten days, the band tracked and mixed 16 songs. This new set of material found the band incorporating various Britpop influences, horns, Hammond organ, and thicker sonics into its sound. But the band also pared some pieces back to an almost minimalist rock aesthetic to push Leo's increasingly dark, personal lyrics to the fore. At the other end of the spectrum, Norborg contributed lead vocals to his compositions "The Unthinkable Is True," "Oh Dear Friends", and "Morley Timmons". The album resulting from these sessions was Set You Free, their second album released in June 1997. The album was received well upon release.

Following the release, they embarked on a well-attended tour with the Boston-based band Karate. During the tour, the band contemplated their future, both as a group and individually. Leo was also going through a bout of depression during the tour, which made it hard for him to want to continue with the band. Chisel's final show was on May 16, 1997, in Knoxville, Tennessee, which was also the last for their tour with Karate. Plans for a West Coast and European tour were canceled.

=== 1997-2022: Post-breakup and other projects ===
After the disbandment, Leo went solo for a short period of time before forming The Sin Eaters, a short-lived band that played a punker style than that of Chisel, featuring members of The Van Pelt and Native Nod. The band recorded a demo tape and played a handful of shows before disbanding. Many songs for the project would later be used for Leo's next band, Ted Leo and the Pharmacists. Ted has played several Chisel songs at performances, the most often performed being "The Town Crusher" from Set You Free.

In 1999, Dugan put out the D!1 EP on the Swedish label Her Magic Field.

Norborg became a founding member of The Reputation shortly after the disbandment of Chisel. He later left the band after the recording and tour for the band's demo due to heavy stress. He received arrangement credits on a few songs of the band's debut album in 2002. In 2001, he released Nobody Knows This Is Everywhere, his first and only solo album, on Dangerfive Records.

=== 2022-present: Reissues and reunion ===
Chisel's digital discography was removed from streaming services on March 14, 2022. It was announced by Numero Group that they were responsible for it and that they would be re-releasing and remastering the band's discography. The re-release would begin with the "It's Alright, You're O.K." b/w "Guns of Meridian Hill" single, with an expanded version of Set You Free coming out in 2023.

An EP titled All My Kin was released on May 10, which includes remastered versions of the title track and "Rip Off The Gift". It also features a previously unreleased live recording of "The Unthinkable is True".

On July 12, they released the Innocents Abroad EP, which includes four remastered songs from Nothing New.

On September 12, the What About Blighty? single was released, which featured a remastered and shortened version of the title track.

Numero announced on September 30 that they will be hosting a festival named Numero Twenty to celebrate the label's 20th anniversary. Among the many reunions planned for the festival, Chisel was announced to perform. On November 16, the band revealed two additional dates, one in California and the other in Chicago.

On November 1, 2023, Numero released a remastered version of "If You Believe in Christmas Trees", a cover that originally appeared as a b-side, commenting on how there were only "53 shopping days" until Christmas.

== Discography ==
=== Albums ===
- 8 A.M. All Day (1996, Gern Blandsten/2023, Numero Group)
- Set You Free (1997, Gern Blandsten/2023, Numero Group)

=== EPs ===
- Stanford Hall Demo (1991, Self-released)
- All My Kin (2022, Numero Group)
- Innocents Abroad (2022, Numero Group)
- Live on WTPS, 1997 (2022, Numero Group)

=== Singles ===
- "Swamp Fox/Spike" b/w "Listen" (1991, Assembly Records)
- Split with Brian, Colin & Vince (1993, Sudden Shame Records)
- "Sunburn" b/w "Little Gidding" "3 O'Clock High" (1994, Gern Blandsten)
- "The O.T.S." b/w "If You Believe in Christmas Trees" (1995, Darla Records)
- Split with Velocity Girl (1996, Shute Records)
- "It's Alright, You're O.K." b/w "Guns of Meridian Hill" (1997, Gern Blandsten/2022, Numero Group)
- "If You Believe in Christmas Trees" (2023, Numero Group)

=== Compilations ===
- Nothing New (1995, Gern Blandsten)

=== Compilation appearances ===
- "Swamp Fox/Spike" on The Jericho Sessions (1991, WVFI Radio)
- "Sloth" on Superpowers (1993, Troubleman Unlimited)
- "Dream Bar" on Incubus 1993 (1993)
- "Nothing New" on Dog So Large I Cannot See Past It (1997, WPRB Radio)
- "Out for Kicks" on Squirrel (1995, Level Records)
- "Six Different Ways" on Give Me the Cure (1995, Radiopaque)
- "No Alibis" on Tatterfrock Eight (1996, Jumpjet)
- "Theme For A Pharmacist" on CMJ New Music Monthly Volume One (1996, College Music Journal)
- "Hip Straights" on Little Darla Has A Treat For You Volume 3 (1996, Darla Records)
- "Chiefs" on Storm of the Century (1997, Sudden Shame Records)
- "The Guns of Meridian Hill" on Fort Reno Benefit Compilation (1997, Resin Records)
- "Do Go On" on Gern Blandsten - The First Nine Years (2001, Gern Blandsten)
- "The O.T.S." on Darla 100 (2002, Darla Records)
- "Your Star Is Killing Me" on Numero Twenty (2023, Numero Group)
- "The Guns of Meridian Hill" on Ted Leo Used To Believe (Demos 1987-2012) (Self-released)

=== DVDs ===
- "Spectacles" on Songs for Cassavetes (2001, Better Looking Records)

=== Bootlegs ===
- Live at Burlingtonitus One (4-16-94) (2005)
- Live at the Empty Bottle, Chicago (2023)
