= Shake the Sheets =

Studio album by Ted Leo and the Pharmacists
- Released: October 19, 2004
- Recorded: May 17–19, May 20–June 5, 2004
- Studio: Avatar Studios, New York City; Stratosphere Studios, New York City
- Genre: Indie rock, punk rock
- Length: 39:52
- Label: Lookout!
- Producer: Chris Shaw

Ted Leo and the Pharmacists chronology
Hearts of Oak (2003)	Shake the Sheets (2004)	Living with the Living (2007)

Singles from Shake the Sheets
- 1. "Me and Mia" Released: 2004

Shake the Sheets is the fourth studio album by the Washington, D.C. rock band Ted Leo and the Pharmacists, released in 2004 by Lookout! Records. It was the band's last album for the Lookout! label. A music video was filmed for the single "Me and Mia", a song about a friend of frontman Ted Leo who's battled an eating disorder.

== Critical reception ==
Professional ratings
Aggregate scores
Source	Rating
Metacritic	79/100
Review scores
Source	Rating
AllMusic	4/5 stars
Alternative Press	4/5 stars
Blender	4/5 stars
The Boston Phoenix	3.5/4 stars
Entertainment Weekly	A
NME	7/10
Pitchfork	7.0/10
Q	3/5 stars
Rolling Stone	3/5 stars
Uncut	3/5 stars

Shake the Sheets received positive reviews from music critics. At Metacritic, which assigns a normalized rating out of 100 to reviews from mainstream critics, the album received an average score of 79, based on 24 reviews.

Nisha Gopalan from Entertainment Weekly wrote about the track listing, "Practically every song is a near-perfect amalgam of straight-up melodies and pogoing beats." Tim Sendra of AllMusic praised the album's stripped-down approach to its messages and instrumentation and Leo for continuing to craft strong musicianship in his vocals and lyrics, concluding with, "Fiercely political without being to specific, filled with moments that will have you jumping out of your seat with excitement, Shake the Sheets is more proof that Ted Leo & the Pharmacists are the only band that matters, punk or otherwise." Alec Hanley Bemis from Blender found criticism in Leo's fast-paced delivery causing his lyrics to feel hazy and lose energy after the first three tracks but praised his musical pastiche of '70s pub rock and '80s punk, along with "a half-dozen modern swing and shuffle rhythms", calling it "a pop-punk update on Springsteen". Rolling Stone's Jon Caramanica commended Leo for clearing up his themes and sound while remaining a vocal presence but found the attention to politics muted. Pitchfork contributor Rob Mitchum saw the record moving away from Hearts of Oak's "more aggressively percussive approach," noting the scaling back of Leo's idiosyncratic musical repertoire, the presence of backing band the Pharmacists and the political aspects of the songs being hampered by "unrepresentative cliché-driven lyrical content," but said "while disappointing, Shake the Sheets remains better than most of its current brethren in indie cryostasis."

== Tour ==
On February 13, 2024, Leo announced they will perform the album in its entirety as part of a 20th anniversary tour, starting on June 19 at The Stone Pony in Asbury Park, New Jersey, and finishing on November 16 at The Belasco in Los Angeles.

== Track listing ==
All lyrics are written by Ted Leo.

No.	Title	Length
1.	"Me and Mia"	3:30
2.	"The Angels' Share"	3:46
3.	"The One Who Got Us Out"	3:04
4.	"Counting Down the Hours"	3:08
5.	"Little Dawn"	5:33
6.	"Heart Problems"	3:13
7.	"Criminal Piece"	2:42
8.	"Better Dead Than Lead"	3:46
9.	"Shake the Sheets"	4:43
10.	"Bleeding Powers"	2:51
11.	"Walking to Do"	3:36

== Personnel ==
Credits adapted from the album's booklet.

Ted Leo and the Pharmacists

- Ted Leo – guitars, vocals, percussion
- Dave Lerner – bass guitar, backing vocals on "Walking to Do"
- Chris Wilson – drums

Additional musicians

- Chris Shaw – glockenspiel on "Counting Down the Hours", piano on "Criminal Piece", backing vocals on "Walking to Do"
- Sarah Field – backing vocals on "Walking to Do"
- Eric Tew – backing vocals on "Walking to Do"

Production

- Chris Shaw – producer, engineering, mixing
- Brian Montgomery – assistant engineering
- Ruddy Lee Cullers – assistant engineering
- Arjan Agerwala – assistant engineering
- Ted Leo – assistant mixing
- Eric Tew – additional editing
- Howie Weinberg – mastering (Masterdisk)

Imagery

- Christopher Appelgren – art direction, design, construction
- Liberty Pierson – additional design, illustrations
- Jason Munn – additional design
