= Brainiac discography =

- Studio albums: 3
- EPs: 3
- Compilation albums: 2
- Singles: 6
- Music videos: 2

The discography of the American indie rock band Brainiac consists of 3 studio albums, two compilation albums, three EP's, six singles and two music videos.

== Albums ==
=== Studio albums ===
Title	Album details
Smack Bunny Baby	Released: July 1993; Label: Grass/BMG; Format: CD, LP, DD
Bonsai Superstar	Released: November 21, 1994; Label: Grass/BMG; Format: CD, LP, DD
Hissing Prigs in Static Couture	Released: March 26, 1996; Label: Touch & Go; Format: CD, LP, DD

=== Compilation albums ===
Title	Album details
Attic Tapes	Released: June 12, 2021; Label: Touch & Go; Format: 2xLP, DD
From Dayton Ohio	Released: June 12, 2021; Label: Touch & Go; Format: 2xLP, DD

== EPs ==
Title	Album details
Internationale	Released: October 10, 1995; Label: Touch & Go; Format: CD, 7" single
Electro-Shock for President	Released: April 1, 1997; Label: Touch & Go; Format: CD, LP, DD
The Predator Nominate	Released: January 20, 2023; Label: Touch & Go; Format: LP, DD

== Singles ==
- Superduperseven 7" (1992, Limited Potential)
- I Could Own You (Live) 7" (split single with Bratmobile, 1993, 12x12 Records)
- Dexatrim 7" (split single with Lazy, 1994, Simple Solution) (John Schmersal's debut as new guitarist)
- Cookie Doesn't Sing 7" (split single w/Today Is The Day, Chrome Cranks, and Steel Pole Bathtub Vol. 10/ CD Comp., 1995, Dope-Guns-'N-Fucking In The Streets Vols. 8–11, Amphetamine Reptile Records)
- Go! 4x7" single (Jabberjaw Vol. 6, CD Comp., 1996, Mammoth Records)
- Petrified single (Ubu Dance Party: A Tribute To Pere Ubu, CD Comp., 1997, Datapanik)
- We'll Eat Anything 10" lathe-cut single (2024 remaster of 1992 early demos, People In A Position To Know PIAPTK-353)

== Filmography ==
=== Music Videos ===
- "Strung" (1996)
- "Vincent Come on Down" (1996)

=== Films ===
- Brainiac: Transmissions after Zero (2019)
