= Matt Schulz =

American drummer

Schulz in 2016

Matt Schulz is an American drummer who was in the past a member of Enon, Lab Partners, and Obits and is currently active as a member of Holy Fuck, Savak, Lake Ruth, Aperiodic, and Immersion (musicians).

He has also played with School of Seven Bells, The Boggs, Les Savy Fav, Summer Heart, Fred Armisen, US Girls, Anya van Rose, and Exit Angles.

== Discography ==
- Cigarhead/Honeyburn split 7-inch, Lo-Fi Recordings (1995)
- Cigarhead/Morsel split 7-inch, Simple Solution (1995)
- Honeyburn '5th Of July' b/w 'A Little Less' 7-inch, Trout (1996)
- Aperiodic 'Cassette' (1997)
- Aperiodic 'Throws Like A Girl' Track On Comp. CD, Rejected Art (1998)
- Let's Crash 7-inch, Pixeldefense, ltd. (1999)
- Lab Partners CD, Theory Recordings (1999)
- John Stuart Mill 'Now And Forever', 'Eternal Story' (drums), Seethru Broadcasting (1999)
- Let's Crash 'Stand Up And Relax' CD, Pixeldefense, ltd. (2000)
- Lab Partners 'Turn It On' CD, Theory Recordings (2000)
- Enon 'Listen (While You Talk) 7-inch, Self-Starter Foundation (2000)
- Enon 'The Nightmare Of Atomic Men' b/w 'Pollen Lane' 7-inch, Sub Pop Single Of The Month (2001)
- Enon 'Raisin Heart' b/w 'Marbles Explode' 7-inch, Friction Goods (2001)
- Enon 7-inch, Do-Tell Records (2002)
- Enon 'High Society' LP/CD, Touch and Go (2002)
- Enon 'Drowning Appointments' b/w 'Perfect Draft' 7-inch, frenchkiss (2002)
- Enon 'In This City' EP, Touch and Go (2003)
- Enon 'Evidence' b/w 'Grain Of Assault' 7-inch, Troubleman Unlimited (2003)
- Enon/Bloodthirsty Lovers 'Because Of You' b/w '2000 Light Years' split 7-inch, ShingleStreet (2003)
- Enon 'Starcastic' b/w 'Birdnest' 7-inch, Touch and Go (2003)
- Enon 'Hocus Pocus' LP/CD, Touch and Go (2003)
- Enon 'Lost Marbles & Exploded Evidence' CD/DVD, Touch and Go (2005)
- Thunderbirds Are Now! 'Why We War' (Percussion), frenchkiss (2006)
- Enon 'Grass Geysers...Carbon Clouds' LP/CD, Touch and Go (2007)
- Les Savy Fav "Let's Stay Friends",'The Year Before The Year 2000', 'Kiss Kiss Is Getting Old' (Drums), frenchkiss (2007)
- Holy Fuck "LP"-'Super Inuit', 'Milkshake' (Drums), Young Turks/XL (2007)
- Enon 'Little Ghost' b/w 'Swab The Deck' 7-inch. Silver Rocket (2008)
- Enon 'Ashish' Track on 'Living Bridge' Comp. CD, Rare Book Room (2008)
- Holy Fuck 'Lovely Allen' b/w 'Super Inuit (studio)' 7-inch, Young Turks/XL (2008)
- Love As Laughter 'Bonnie & Clyde' (Percussion), Glacial Pace/Epic (2008)
- Foals/Holy Fuck 'Balloons' b/w 'Super Inuit' split 12-inch, white label (2008)
- Boredoms "77 Boadrum" (Drums), Book/DVD/CD, Avex (2008)
- Aperiodic "Air Below Mountains/Louder" 7-inch (Drums), Generate Records (2009)
- Off The International Radar "Holy Radar" 12-inch (Drums), Hand Drawn Dracula (2009)
- Human Reunion 'Boost' (Drums), Minor Manor Media (2010)
- Holy Fuck "Latin" LP/CD, Young Turks/XL (2010)
- Holy Fuck 'Latin America' b/w 'Foxy' 7-inch, Young Turks/XL (2010)
- Holy Fuck 'Red Lights' b/w 'Dr. Dr.E' 7-inch, Young Turks/XL (2010)
- Boredoms "77 Boadrum" (Drums), DVD Documentary, Thrill Jockey (2010)
- Holy Fuck "Hole In Your Parachute(Shugo Tokumaru" DL (drums), Hand Drawn Dracula (2011)
- Devin 'You're Mine' b/w 'Thing On My Mind' 7-inch (drums), frenchkiss (2012)
- Devin 'Romancing' LP/CD (drums), frenchkiss (2012
- Holy Fuck "Latin America" (drums), StuBru Vinyl Record Store Day EP (2012)
- Aperiodic 'Future Feedback' LP/CD, Phratry Records (2012)
- Aperiodic 'Cassette 2' MC, Factotum Tapes (2013)
- Aperiodic "Something That Satisfies Me"/"Scene Crush (Graham Walsh mix) [DL only]" Dbl 7-inch w/Joe 4, Mala En Se, and Knife the Symphony, Phratry Records (2013)
- Holy Fuck "Chimes Broken" b/w "Sabbatics" 7-inch (drums), Mistletone Records (2014)
- Holy Fuck "Cassette No1" (drums), no label (2014)
- The New Lines "schismogenesis" DL/MC (drums), no label (2015)
- Lake Ruth "The Inconsolable Jean Claude" b/w "The Prisoner's Dilemma" 7-inch (drums), The Great Pop Supplement / Deep Distance (2016)
- Holy Fuck 'Congrats' LP/CD/MC, Innovative Leisure (2016)
- Savak "Best of Luck in Future Endeavors" LP/CD, Comedy Minus One (2016)
- Lake Ruth "Actual Entity" LP (drums), The Great Pop Supplement / Deep Distance (2016)
- Future Generations "s/t" CD/DL (drums), frenchkiss (2016)
- The New Lines "Love and Cannibalism" LP (drums), Feral Child (2016)
- Lake Ruth "Empty Morning" (drums), VA - Colors Compilations - Violet "Dreampop" DL, The Blog That Celebrates Itself Records (2017)
- Lake Ruth "Monstre Sacre" (Stereolab)' (drums), VA - Stereolab in, Metronomic Underground Versions DL, The Blog That Celebrates Itself Records (2017)
- Holy Fuck 'Bird Brains' EP/DL, Innovative Leisure (2017)
- COVERBAND 'S/T' MC, part of Deerhoof 'Artist in Residence' box set, Joyful Noise (2017)
- Savak 'Cut Ups' LP/CD, Ernest Jennings Record Company (2017)
- Savak "Where Should I Start?" b/w "Expensive Things" 7-inch, Modern City Records (2017)
- Lake Ruth w/Listening Center "Intervention, Displacement & Return" MC, WW2W (2017)
- Lake Ruth 'Birds of America' LP/DL, Feral Child (2018)
- Savak "Green & Desperate" b/w "This Dying Lake" 7-inch, Orangerie (2018)
- Immersion (musicians) 'Sleepless' LP, swim ~ (2018)
- Slows "A Great Big Smile from Venus" LP, Deep Distance (2018)
- Savak 'Beg Your Pardon' LP/CD, Ernest Jennings Record Company (2018)
- Lake Ruth w/Listening Center "Only An Ocean" split w/Pale Lights, 7-inch Kleine Untergrund Schallplatten (2019)
- Lake Ruth "Extended Leave" b/w "Strange Interiors" 7-inch, Slumberland Records (2019)
- Savak 'Mirror Maker' EP, Ernest Jennings Record Company (2019)
- Lake Ruth w/Listening Center "How I Hear You" track on 'The Sunday Experience' 7-inch EP, Polytechnic Youth (2020)
- Holy Fuck 'Deleter' LP/CD/DL, Holy Ef (2020)
- Lake Ruth 'Crying Everyone Else's Tears' 10-inch EP, Kleine Untergrund Schallplatten (2020)
- Savak 'Rotting Teeth In The Horse's Mouth' LP/CD/DL, Ernest Jennings Record Company (2020)
- Fake Names 's/t' LP/CD/DL, Epitaph (2020)
- Savak "The Point of the Point" b/w "Checked Out" 8" Lathe cut, Dromedary Records (2020)
- Edsel 'A Lost Language ep' DL, self released (2020)
- Savak "Feel What You Feel" b/w "Access Egress" 7-inch/DL, Peculiar Works (2020)
- Nickolas Mohanna & Matt Schulz 'Automatic' DL, bs,bta. (2021)
- Holy Fuck "Airport Dreams" b/w "Lost Cool" 7-inch, Polytechnic Youth (2021)
- Savak 'Human Error/ Human Delight' LP, Peculiar Works (2022)
- Holy Fuck "95" single DL, Holy Ef (2022)
- Roid Rage 'Beat Lethal' ep DL, no label (2022)
- Savak 'Error/Delight' remixes DL, Peculiar Works (2022)
- Lake Ruth w/Listening Center "law and Disorder", Lessinghof - Eine Zusammenstellung von Kleine Untergrund Schallplatten, LP 2022
- Roid Rage "Dead Submarine" single DL, no label (2023)
- Gold Minutes '1', DL, no label (2023)
- Savak 'Flavors of Paradise', LP/DL, Peculiar Works (2024)
- Holy Fuck/ Dr. Sure's Unusual Practice 'Split', 10" lathe cut, A Low Hum (2024)
- Holy Fuck 'Cassette', LP, Feral Child (2024)
- Savak 'Split' w/Contractions, 12" ep, Peculiar Works (2024)
- Immersion (musicians) 'Nanocluster Vol. 2' LP, swim ~ (2024)
- Savak 'Child's Pose b/w Talk To Some People' 7" flexi disc, Peculiar Works (2024)
- Savak 'SQUAWK!' LP, Peculiar Works (2025)
- Lake Ruth 'Hawking Radiation' LP/CD, Feral Child/Dell'Orso (2025)
- Immersion (musicians) 'WTF??' LP/CD, swim ~ (2025)
- Immersion (musicians) "Radio Signals" b/w "We Don't Need Your Validation", lathe cut 7", swim ~ (2025)
- Holy Fuck 'Event Beat', LP, DL, Satellite Services (2026)
- Immersion (musicians) 'What is Lost Will Return' LP/CD, swim ~ (2026)
- Anya Van Rose "Sleep Smoking" DL, Real Grey records (2026)
- Saline Eyes "Nothing's Wrong" DL (2026)
- Saline Eyes "Standing Where You Are" DL (2026)
- Saline Eyes "Say Goodbye" DL (2026)
- Saline Eyes "Less Emotion" DL (2026)

== Compilations ==
with Enon:

- 2001 track "New York's Alright (If You Like Saxophones)" on This Is Next Year: A Brooklyn-Based Compilation
- 2002 track "White Rabbit" on Don't Know When I'll Be Home Again (A Compilation Benefiting American Veterans Of The Vietnam War)
- 2003 track "Sex Beat" on On The High Wire (U.S. Pop Life Vol. 15 Power - Energy)
- 2004 track "Shave" on The 2004 Believer Music Issue Compilation
- 2005 track "Marbles Explode" on Friction Records Free Sampler CD

Schulz has also performed on remixes of tracks by Röyksopp, Radiohead, Bloc Party, and others.

== Videography ==
- "Window Display", Enon, (2002, directed by Brian Quain, not an official video)
- "Carbonation", Enon,(July 2002, directed by Paul Cordes Wilm)
- "Pleasure and Privilege", Enon, (October 2002, directed by Clark Vogeler)
- "In This City", Enon, (February 2003, directed by Josh Graham, Juan Monasterio, and Arya Senboutaraj)
- "Murder Sounds", Enon, (2004, directed by Paul Cordes Wilm)
- "Daughter in the House of Fools", Enon, (2004, directed by Rainbows & Vampires)
- "Don't Go (Girls and Boys)", Fefe Dobson, (2004, directed by Rainbows & Vampires)
- "Arm in Arm", The Boggs, (2006, directed by Jason Friedman)
- "Paperweights", Enon, (2007, directed by Paul Cordes Wilm)
- "Mr. Ratatatatat", Enon, (2007, directed by Yoonha Park)
- "Latin America", Holy Fuck, (2010, directed by Yoonha Park)
- "Red Lights", Holy Fuck, (2010, directed by Brian Borcherdt)

== Television performances ==
In March 2005, Schulz was featured w/Enon on MTV's The Real World Austin. In March 2013 he performed with Pinback on Late Night with Jimmy Fallon. In April 2013 he joined Fred Armisen, Bill Hader, and Taran Killam as part of faux punk group Ian Rubbish and the Bizzaros for a Saturday Night Live sketch entitled "The History of Punk". Schulz has also been a substitute for Fred Armisen with The 8G Band on Late Night with Seth Meyers, appearing in over 50 episodes during season 2 .

== Sampling ==
Schulz was first sampled on the title track of Enon's first LP, Believo! His drums are also featured (along with the other members of Enon) on the Azealia Banks track "Gimme a Chance" from her 2014 LP Broke With Expensive Taste.

== Equipment ==
Schulz counts C&C Custom Drums, Istanbul Agop Cymbals, Tama Drums Hardware, Los Cabos Drumsticks, Snareweight, Attack Drumheads, Canopus snare wires, and Protection Racket cases among his current endorsers.
