= Plvs Vltra =

Indie rock band

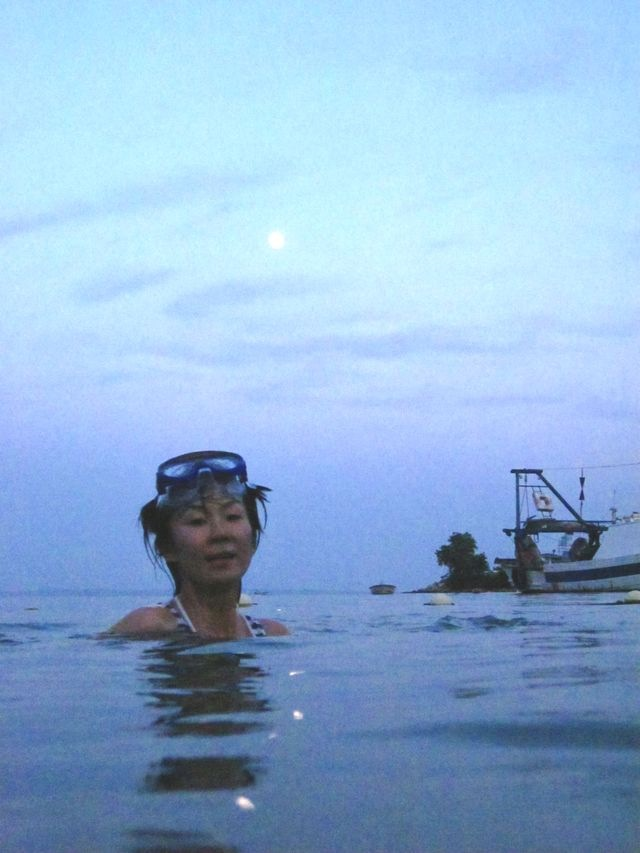

Background information
- Origin: Los Angeles
- Genres: Indie rock
- Years active: 2012–present
- Labels: Spectrum Spools; Field Hymns
- Members: Toko Yasuda
- Website: plvsvltra.bandcamp.com

Plvs Vltra is the indie rock solo project of Toko Yasuda (Enon, Blonde Redhead, The Lapse, The Van Pelt), featuring melodic, fractured tunes created on samplers, vintage synthesizers, drum machines and various effects alongside Yasuda's comforting singsong vocals.

Since forming in 2012, Plvs Vltra has released two albums and one single.

== Band name ==
The project's name derives from the motto of Spain, "plus ultra", meaning "further beyond" in Latin and stylized with the letter 'V' replacing the letter 'U' as in the early Roman alphabet. The phrase is engraved in a fireplace at Fonthill Castle in Doylestown, Pennsylvania. Yasuda was inspired by the motto while touring the historic Arts and Crafts mansion.

== Biography ==
After Enon ceased to be an ongoing recording and touring concern in 2011, Yasuda made the first recordings for what would become Plvs Vltra's debut album, Parthenon. The sessions included collaborations with Enon's John Schmersal, who produced the album, as well as with friends Danny Ray Thompson of the Sun Ra Arkestra, Scott Allen of Thunderbirds Are Now, and Thomas Keville of Man Man. Yasuda spent much of 2011 mostly keeping to herself and "compiling unfinished tracks" before she "decided to wrap them up by making deadlines."

The opening track, "Flowers To Bees," was featured in Tiny Mix Tapes' Chocolate Grinder section. Yasuda collaborated with Scott Allen on the song, finishing a backing track Allen had created. Danny Ray Thompson played baritone sax, flute and contributed percussion, adding "emotions to these electronic tunes," according to Yasuda. The title track includes a sample from a "storybook vinyl album" Yasuda found at a thrift store.

Parthenon was released in 2012 on Austrian experimental label Spectrum Spools/Editions Mego. "As if Alice Coltrane's Universal Consciousness was...sent into the future to be reimagined as an electronic pop record...Parthenon refuses to be pinned down," enthused Spectrum's biography. SPIN rated Parthenon 7 out of 10 stars, citing its fusion of Kylie Minogue and Boredoms influences. Resident Advisor rated the album 3.5 of 5 stars, calling the record an "addictive jumble...a confusingly infectious record" with catchy hooks but puzzling lyrics. Tiny Mix Tapes called Parthenon a "straight-up pop album with alluring (because “sexy” sounds misogynist and creepy) female vocals." The Quietus said Yasuda's songs are "equivalent to playing Twister in order to lose, turning in on themselves the very game-logics of popular sounds and structures."

Yasuda quickly followed that release with a second album, Yo-Yo Blue, on the Field Hymns cassette-only label in 2013. Though the album was limited to 100 physical copies, Yo-Yo Blue was also released digitally via Bandcamp. Field Hymns described the album to a "thumbed-through flip book of vaporous, hazy memories...replete with childhood recitals, fragments of half-remembered stanzas and sumptuous j-pop interludes." Cassette Love said the mostly instrumental album "has the mood of a dream, floating above and observing a variety of scenes; detached, yet focused" and singled out the vocal performances on “ちょ-ちょ (with Nico)” and “Falling Slowly” as "worthy of being featured on a single all by themselves."

Later that year Yasuda released a 7" single, "Rooftop Arcade" b/w "Mesopotamia" on Columbus-based Scioto Records. Schmersal and Yasuda produced both songs, which were primarily composed on an Akai MPC4000 sampler.

== Equipment ==
Yasuda plays hardware synths including a Minimoog Voyager, Nord Lead 2 and Casio SK-1 to sample and play melodies, along with some effects including Kaoss Pad and reverb. She typically makes beats using an Akai MPC4000 and Ableton Live software. "[Schmersal] and I also ran lots of signals through various hardware components as we were mixing," Yasuda told Tiny Mix Tapes. "Old mic [pre-amps]...mixers, compressors, and effects boxes." Yasuda also uses a Tascam 424 cassette four-track to send signals to and from the digital realm. "That’s my effort to create a little more organic sounding tracks," Yasuda said in an interview with the Left Turn 4 Records zine.

== Touring ==
From 2011-2014 Yasuda toured with St. Vincent playing synth. She has performed a limited number of live shows as Plvs Vltra, but feels that her one-woman shows lack the stage presence of her other musical projects. "I feel like me standing alone on stage with musical toys might not be captivating enough," Yasuda told Left Turn 4 Records in 2013, "I feel bad for these people who are watching me pressing buttons on stage by myself."

== Discography ==
=== Albums ===
- 2012 Parthenon CD and LP (Spectrum Spools/Editions Mego)
- 2013 Yo-Yo Blue cassette and digital release (Field Hymns/Bandcamp)

=== Singles ===
- 2013 '"Rooftop Arcade" / "Mesopotamia" 7" (Scioto Records)

=== Compilation appearances ===
- 2013 "Mizu" on "Mixtape: Summer 2013" cassette and digital release (LT4/Bandcamp)
