= The World/Inferno Friendship Society =

American band

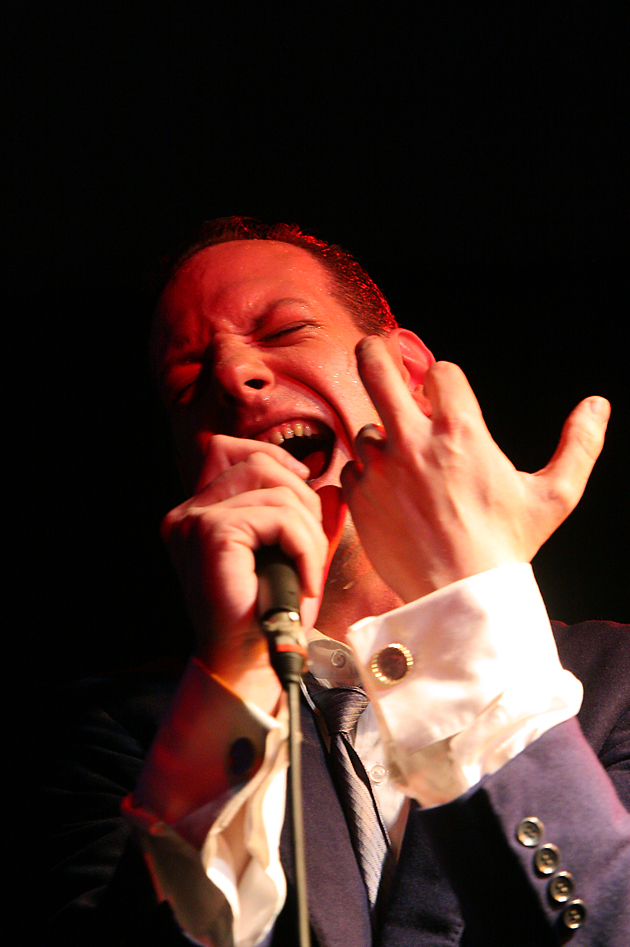
- The lead singer of the band, Jack Terricloth

Background information
- Also known as: World Inferno, Inferno
- Origin: Brooklyn, New York, U.S.
- Genres: Punk rock; dark cabaret; swing punk
- Years active: 1994–2021
- Labels: Alternative Tentacles; Chunksaah; Go-kart Europe; Gern Blandsten; The Company With The Golden Arm
- Members: Brendan Furey; Felipe Torres; Scott Hollingsworth; Aaron Hammes; Rafael Calderon; Jeffrey Young; Gina Marie Rodriguez; Matt Dallow
- Past members: Jack Terricloth
- Website: http://www.worldinferno.com/

The World/Inferno Friendship Society (also referred to as World Inferno, or Inferno) was an American band from Brooklyn, New York. Its style merged punk, soul, klezmer and jazz, while its collective membership featured horns, piano and guitar and had a membership of about 40 players, of whom only about seven to ten active members usually performed at a time. The group was led by singer Jack Terricloth, who was the only constant during the group's history. Terricloth was known for his pointed commentary during shows; his monologues touched on politics and his transformation from the "old school."

Its lyrics often concerned historical or biographical subjects, such as Weimar-era Germany, Peter Lorre, Jeffrey Lee Pierce of the Gun Club, Paul Robeson, Leni Riefenstahl, Dante Alighieri, Philip K. Dick, and Jonathan Fire*Eater.

Terricloth died on May 12th 2021, effectively ending the band. Terricloth's sister Lisa Ventantonio and band cofounder Scott Hollingsworth founded The Jack Terricloth Foundation in 2022 that have produced multiple events and media, including the tribute album Endless Possibility: A Tribute to Jack Terricloth (featuring artists and collaborators such as Will Wood, Worriers, The Slackers, My Favorite, Ted Leo, The Bouncing Souls, Catbite, Jeff Rosenstock, and more) since his passing. Surviving members of the Inferno's 'Heritage Lineup' (spanning 2001-2005) have since formed and recorded under the name Just the Best Party.

== Hallowmas ==
The World/Inferno Friendship Society's annual Halloween show, Hallowmas, was its most-anticipated performance of the year. The event was known for its elaborate planning and surprises. Past Hallowmases have included a burning effigy of Mr. Terricloth constructed and set alight by a large, caustic cat; an ethereal string quartet performing throughout the evening in the rear of the hall; circus performances and fire breathing by the Odd Child Uprising troupe and a cadaverous marching band materializing on stage for the finale, "Pumpkin Time". The song (performed only at Hallowmas shows) includes street rallies, and references The Great Pumpkin from the Peanuts comic strip.

== Members ==
Name	Instrument(s)	Years	Other groups
Jack Terricloth	Lead vocals, misc. instruments	1996–2021	Sticks and Stones, P.E.D.
Scott Hollingsworth	Keyboards, bass, programming, producer, engineer	1996–1999, 2012–2020	Sticks and Stones
Aaron Hammes	Baritone saxophone, guitar, vocals	2012–2021	The Del Moroccos, Deal's Gone Bad, The Stranger, Res Novae, Roselit Bone
Rafael Calderon	Trumpet	2014–2021	The Bandulos, Rising Sun Gang, DYT, Cause and the Effects
Jeffrey Young	Violin	2014–2020	thingNY, Valerie Kuehne and the Wasps Nests
Gina Marie Rodriguez	Electric bass, backing vocals	April–May 2005, 2018–2021	Moisturizer, Madam Robot and the Lust Brigade, Telemeres
Brendan Furey	Electric guitar	2018–2021	Senator Horse, Future Ghosts, Off Target, Teorema, Vice Trip
Felipe Torres	Drums	2018–2021	Slambovian Circus of Dreams, Zire's War, Reagan Youth, The Monkees, The Davy Jones Band, Res Novae
Matt Dallow	Accordion, keyboards, theremin	2018–2021	Amour Obscur, Vic Thrill, Dead Man's Terminal, The Pendulum Swings, The Trummytones, Space Robot Scientists, Telemeres

Other Personnel
Name	Instrument(s)	Years active	Other groups
Ellie Goodman	Violin	2020–2021	Speakeasy Streets, Teorema
Jonny Zuckerman (Jonny Zeee)	Guitar	2019–2020	Powdermaker, Kung Fury, The Shivering Brigade, Res Novae
Matthew Landis	Keyboards	2008–2015, 2017–2019	Minor Arcana, Poison Street, Teorema, Vice Trip
Benjamin Reichman	Trumpet, guitar	2017–2019	Glowing-Eyed Friends, Future Ghosts
Francis Morin	Guitar	2010–2018	Voltaire, Serpenteens, Res Novae, Black Rose Burning
Sandra Malak	Bass, vocals	2006–2019	Leftöver Crack, The Working Mothers, SHLSHKD, Twitcher, Elegant Everyone
Mora Precarious/Jess Townsend	Drums	2010–2018	Parlour Bells, Ketman, Trabants
Peter Hess	Tenor saxophone, clarinet, percussion	1998–2011, 2013–2014, 2019	Guignol, Slavic Soul Party, Anti-Social Music, Balkan Beat Box, Capital M, The Peter Hess Quartet, Asphalt Orchestra, Just the Best Party
Rebecca Schlappich	Violin	2011–2015, 2019	Kiss Kiss, Mariachi El Bronx, River City Extension, Ben Harper & The Innocent Criminals
Leslie Wacker	Alto saxophone	2010–2012	Emperor Norton's Stationary Marching Band
Ken Thomson	Baritone saxophone, clarinet	2005–2010	Gutbucket, Asphalt Orchestra, Anti-Social Music, Signal
Raja Azar	Piano, backing vocals	2006–2010	Jollyship the Whiz-Bang
Benjamin Kotch	Drums	1997–2007, 2010, 2019	Eve's Plum, Just The Best Party
Lucky Strano	Guitar	1996–2010, 2019	Morning Glory, Sewage, Devastation Wagon, Banner of Hope, Just the Best Party
Maura Corrigan	Alto saxophone	1998–2010, 2019	Georgia Redcoat Marching Band, Mod Alpert, Just the Best Party
Brian Viglione	Drums	2008–2009, 2018, 2019	The Dresden Dolls, Nine Inch Nails, HUMANWINE, Voltaire, Violent Femmes, Morning Glory
Kevin Raczka	Drums	2007–2008	Jollyship The Whiz-Bang, Hungry March Band
Ara Babajian	Drums	2007	Leftöver Crack, The Slackers, Star Fucking Hipsters
Semra Ercin	Percussion, bells, backing vocals	1996–2008, 2019	The Working Mothers, Chandeliers, kiss Slash Crooked Smile, Casa de Chihuahua, Kid Casanova, Just the Best Party
Franz Nicolay	Accordion, piano, backing vocals	2001–2008, 2010–2011, 2019	Guignol, The Hold Steady, Anti-Social Music, Against Me!, Voltaire, Just the Best Party
Yula Beeri	Electric bass, backing vocals	1999–2006, 2019	Nanuchka, Star Fucking Hipsters, Yula & the eXtended Family, Y&I, Just the Best Party
Karen Kanan Correa	Bass, backing vocals, viola	2005–2006	Demander
Erik Proft	Shouts	2007	Planned Collapse, Kama Rupa, Missing Foundation
Steve Paelet	Electric bass	2002	
Dan Bailey	Baritone saxophone	1998–2005, 2019	Milk Money, The Grown-Ups, The Panic, The Maspeth Holders, Just the Best Party
Kevin Corzett	Tenor saxophone	2007–2009	Reverend Glasseye, Ketman, Walter Sickert and the Army of Broken Toys, Emperor Norton's Stationary Marching Band
John Moore	Baritone saxophone	1997–1998	
Brian Pearl	Piano	2000–2001	Matt Pond PA
Ms. Xtal Chaos	Tuba	1996–1998	
Detroit Rios	Percussion	1997–1998	
Stephe Polier	Tenor saxophone	1997–1999	
Geoff Blythe	Tenor saxophone	1999	Dexys Midnight Runners, The Bureau, Black 47, The TKO Horns
Sam Burns	Tenor saxophone	1999–2000	
Rio Glenn (ABC No Rio)	Backing vocals	1999–2000	
Kika Von Kluck	Backing vocals	1997–1998	
Sioux Kovax	Backing vocals	1996–1997 (graphics, 1994–2003)	
Mike Wagner	Trombone	1999	Antibalas, King Changó, Moshiach Oi!
Klaus Schank	Trombone	1998	Scrapy
Lauren Black	Trumpet	1997–1999	Kenn Firpo Rent Explosion, 1,000 Pounds of People
David Patrikios	Marimba, banjo	1997–1999	Serpico, Milhouse, Greensleep, The Realistics, The Flying Aces
Chris Leo	Trombone	1997	The Van Pelt, The Sin Eaters, The Lapse, Native Nod
Dan Neustadt	Piano, backing vocals		The Hold Steady
Jeffrey Wengrofsky	Cabaret Host, Funeral Director, Actor, Bag of Nothing	1996–2021	Syndicate of Human Image Traffickers
Jon Gilch	Drums		Sticks and Stones

== Discography ==
=== Albums ===
- The True Story of the Bridgewater Astral League – 1997
- Just the Best Party – 2002
- Red-Eyed Soul – 2006
- Addicted to Bad Ideas: Peter Lorre's Twentieth Century – 2007
- The Anarchy and the Ecstasy – 2011
- This Packed Funeral – 2014
- All Borders Are Porous to Cats – 2020

=== Live/compilation albums ===
- East Coast Super Sound Punk of Today! (compilation) – 2000
- Hallowmas: Live at Northsix – 2003
- Valhalla, Definitely (compilation) – 2023

=== EPs ===
- International Smashism! – 2001
- Speak of Brave Men – 2004
- Me v. Angry Mob – 2005
- Vox Inferne – 2010
- Maps, Saints & Just This Side of Way Too Much (live, 2 songs from The Anarchy and the Ectasy) – 2012
- Turnstile Comix #2 (three-song EP released with a comic book) – 2013

=== Singles ===
- "Tattoos Fade" b/w "Nothing You Begin" (1994), Blue Ghost Records ("Tattoos Fade" was re-released on the East Coast Super Sound Punk of Today! compilation)
- "The Models and the Mannequins" b/w "Glamour Ghouls" (1996), Gern Blandsten Records (both re-released on the East Coast Super Sound Punk of Today! compilation)
- "Our Candidate" b/w "All of California and Everyone Who Lives There Stinks" (1996), Gern Blandsten (both re-released on the East Coast Super Sound Punk of Today! compilation)
- "Pumpkin Time" b/w "Ich Errinere Mich an Weimar" (1999), Gern Blandsten (both re-released on the East Coast Super Sound Punk of Today! compilation)
- "I Wouldn't Want to Live in a World Without Grudges" b/w "All the World Is a Stage (Dive)" (2000), X-Mist Records (both re-recorded for Just the Best Party)
- "Hallowmas 2010" (2010), Chunksaah Records (7" disc distributed at Hallowmas 2010, featuring "Canonize Philip K. Dick, OK")
- "This Packed Funeral" (2013)
- "Freedom Is a Wilderness Made for You and Me" (2019)
- "All I Can Do to Help You with Your Nightmares Is Keep You Up Late" (2019)

=== Unreleased demos ===
- A Demonstrational Introduction to the Astral Plane – 1996–1997
- Powder Waves Goodbye Sessions – 2000
- A Lexicon of Friends & Enemies – 2004
- The New Americana Demos – 2008
- 3 Ring Brain and a Circus Heart – 2010

=== Other appearances ===
- CMJ New Music April 1997 - compilation with CMJ magazine, featuring "Our Candidate"
- Achtung Autobahn (2000) - benefit compilation featuring "Peter Lorre"
- Against Police Injustice (2003) - compilation featuring "Secret Service Freedom Fighting USA"
- Rock Against Bush, Vol. 1 (2004) - compilation featuring "The Expatriate Act"
- Fuck World Trade (2004) - album by Leftöver Crack with "Soon We'll Be Dead"
- Go-Kart vs. The Corporate Giant 4 (2006) - compilation featuring a live version of "Tattoos Fade"
- Hugs for Chelsea (2017) - compilation featuring "Freedom Is a Wilderness"
