= This Can't Exist =

Compilation album by Native Nod
- Released: September 1, 2023
- Recorded: 1992–1994
- Genre: Emo; post-hardcore
- Length: 31:20
- Label: Numero Group

This Can't Exist is a compilation album by American post-hardcore band Native Nod, released by The Numero Group in 2023. The album contains every released recording by Native Nod, except the track "Mr. President" from the Fear of Smell compilation and their demo tape.

== Background ==
Native Nod was formed in 1990 when Chris and Danny Leo met Justin Simon at a skatepark in Bloomfield. They became friends through their shared appreciation of music. Through Simon, they met Dave Lerner.

Native Nod played many of their early shows at ABC No Rio, where they helped grow a scene that detested the often violent hardcore attitudes of CBGBs. The band gained popularity from house concerts around New York and New Jersey, despite not having released any music at the time.

Throughout their period together, the band prided themselves on being different from the hardcore punk scene. They used the term emo as a distinction from those ideas. Through this, the band would embrace humor into their music.

The band would attempt to embark on a tour with the band Iconoclast, which would see the band travel to San Diego. However, the band had disagreements on whether to play a specific show, which led to the band pulling from the tour and disbanding. The band played a formal last show at the Center Unitarian Church in Paramus with Current, Angel Hair, and The Yah Mos.

In 2022, Numero Group announced that they would be reissuing the band's discography. They released This Can't Exist on September 1, 2023, on streaming services and on vinyl.

== Reception ==
Professional ratings
Review scores
Source	Rating
Under The Radar	8.5/10

This Can't Exist generally received positive reviews from critics. Music magazine Under The Radar called the music unique with how their music was "one part Soulside and one part Slint, but really like neither and their own thing completely." Raygun Busch of the band Chat Pile called it one of their favorite albums of 2023. Andrew Sacher of BrooklynVegan called it one of the twenty-one albums that defined the 1990s New York post-hardcore scene.

== Track listing ==
All music by Native Nod.

No.	Title	Length
1.	"Bread"	3:19
2.	"High Tide in Alaska"	4:02
3.	"Back To Mimsey"	4:29
4.	"Answers"	3:24
5.	"Crossings"	2:52
6.	"Tangled"	5:57
7.	"Lower G.I. Bleed"	3:57
8.	"Runner"	3:15
Total length:		31:20

- Tracks 1–3 originally appeared on Bread (1993, Gern Blandsten)
- Tracks 4–6 originally appeared on Native Nod (1992, Gern Blandsten)
- Tracks 7 & 8 originally appeared on New Compositions and Arrangements for the Zither (1995, Gern Blandsten)

== Personnel ==
Personnel per liner notes.

Native Nod

- Chris Leo – vocals
- Danny Leo – drums
- Dave Lerner – bass
- Justin Simon – guitar

Production

- Steve Evetts – recording (tracks 1 to 6), mixing (tracks 3 to 6)
- Alap Momin – recording (tracks 7 to 8)
- Darryl Norsen – design
- Justine DeMetrick – photography
- Harold Simon – photography
- Native Nod – songwriting
- Ken Shipley & Rob Sevier – reissue production
- Adam Luksetich – project management
