= Imaginary Third =

Studio album by The Van Pelt
- Released: April 19, 2014
- Recorded: 1996–1997
- Genre: Indie rock, emo, post-hardcore, alternative rock
- Label: La Castanya Records

The Van Pelt chronology
Sultans of Sentiment (1997)	Imaginary Third (2014)

Imaginary Third is the third album by the alternative rock band The Van Pelt, released in 2014 on La Castanya Records. Although officially presented as a previously unreleased third album, Imaginary Third is a collection of songs previously released between 1997 and 1998 by The Van Pelt (Self Titled EP) and The Lapse (Betrayal!).

== Track listing ==
1. Infinite Me – 2:29
2. The Threat – 2:52
3. ABCD's Of Fascism – 3:04
4. Three People Wide At All Times – 5:10
5. The Betrayal – 2:09
6. Democratic Teacher's Union – 0:57
7. Evil High – 2:29
8. The Speeding Train – 4:03

== Personnel ==
- Toko Yasuda (bass)
- Neil O'Brien (drums)
- Brian Maryansky (guitar, backing vocals)
- Chris Leo (guitar, vocals)
