= Change Remains =

Studio album by Starlight Mints
- Released: 2009
- Genre: Pop
- Length: 30:54
- Label: Barsuk

Starlight Mints chronology
Drowaton (2006)	Change Remains (2009)

Change Remains is the fourth studio album by the American band Starlight Mints, released in 2009. The band supported the album with a North American tour. They broke up shortly after the tour's conclusion.

== Critical reception ==
Professional ratings
Review scores
Source	Rating
AllMusic	4/5 stars
Pitchfork	4.6/10

The McClatchy-Tribune News Service called the album "a pop-friendly, danceable concoction of quirk—it mixes violins, eerie bells, funky guitar riffs, xylophones and theremin, and washes it all down with a sugary-sticky swig of psychedelic Kool-Aid." The Star Tribune labeled it "a fun fermentation of a kitchen sink of sounds—from cheesy space-age electronica to Prince—with written-on-acid lyrics."

== Track listing ==
1. "Coffins 'r' Us" – 1:49
2. "Natural" – 2:41
3. "Paralyzed" – 3:50
4. "Zoomba" – 3:34
5. "Black Champagne" – 3:24
6. "Power Bleed" – 3:25
7. "Gazeretti" – 2:48
8. "Sesame (Untie the Wrath)" – 3:49
9. "Snorkel with a Turtle" – 1:53
10. "40 Fingers" – 3:46
