= Built on Squares =

Studio album by Starlight Mints
- Released: May 20, 2003
- Genre: Indie pop
- Length: 34:11
- Label: PIAS America
- Producer: Allan Vest, Andy Nunez, Trent Bell

Starlight Mints chronology
The Dream That Stuff Was Made Of (2000)	Built on Squares (2003)	Drowaton (2006)

Professional ratings
Review scores
Source	Rating
AllMusic	3/5 stars
Pitchfork	7.7/10
Tiny Mix Tapes	4/5 stars

Built on Squares is a studio album by the indie pop band Starlight Mints.

== Track listing ==
All songs written by Allan Vest, Andy Nunez & Marian Nunez.

1. "Black Cat"
2. "Brass Digger"
3. "Goldstar"
4. "Pages"
5. "Buena Vista"
6. "Irene"
7. "Rinky Dinky"
8. "Zillion Eyes"
9. "Jack in the Squares"
10. "San Diego"
11. "Jimmy Cricket"
