= Gotham! =

Studio album by Radio 4
- Released: February 5, 2002
- Recorded: July 21, 2001
- Genre: Dance-punk; post-punk revival
- Length: 49:26
- Label: City Slang, Gern Blandsten
- Producer: The DFA (James Murphy, Tim Goldsworthy)

Radio 4 chronology
The New Song & Dance (2000)	Gotham! (2002)	Stealing of a Nation (2004)

Gotham! is the second album by the dance-punk/post-punk revival band Radio 4.

Released in 2002, Gotham! became mildly famous in underground club and dance scenes through the release of the single "Dance to the Underground". In a similar way to their 2000 debut, The New Song & Dance, Gotham! was a critical success but not a strong commercial success. However, with their new angrier and more raw sound, the band escaped from critics that stated that Radio 4 were a carbon copy of The Clash. Lyrically, the album has a large amount of strong political content, commenting on pertinent topics such as the NYPD and differences in social class.

== Critical reception ==
Professional ratings
Aggregate scores
Source	Rating
Metacritic	74/100
Review scores
Source	Rating
AllMusic	4.5/5 stars
Alternative Press	9/10
Blender	2/5 stars
The Boston Phoenix	3/4 stars
Drowned in Sound	6/10
Pitchfork	6.1/10
Q	4/5 stars
Rolling Stone	3.5/5 stars
Stylus Magazine	B
Uncut	4/5 stars

Gotham! received positive reviews from music critics who saw it as an improvement from their debut album The New Song & Dance, praising the post-punk production and politically minded lyrics. On Metacritic, which assigns a normalized rating out of 100 to reviews from mainstream critics, the album received an average score of 74, based on 14 reviews.

Peter J. D'Angelo of AllMusic praised the album for its production and lyrics, comparing them positively to The Clash, Mission of Burma and Gang of Four, saying that "Half dance party, half political rally, Gotham! is a rock record for a new era." Leslie Gilotti of Playlouder praised the band for crafting songs that straddle the line between fun dance-punk and political topics surrounding Post-9/11 New York, concluding that "The right-on politics will definitely appeal to lefty sloganeering students, but Radio 4 never get tedious. 'Gotham!' is an infinitely danceable and certainly insightful record that gets better with each listen, on every frequency." Brad Cohan of PopMatters praised the production of Goldsworthy and Murphy for deviating away from the debut album's sound to make it more hook-heavy and body moving, saying that, "Unlike The Rapture and Liars, who share in the movement philosophy but utilize a more angular and anarchic pose, Radio 4’s Gotham! is a near-perfect hybrid of perpetual rhythm, flow and hooks."

The album was met with mixed reviews. While praising the first half of the album for being more nuanced with its sound than its predecessor, Eric Carr of Pitchfork felt that the second half was hampered by Anthony Roman's delivery of the more politically heavy songs being delivered with the "verbal subtlety of an eighth grader with an anarchy symbol stitched onto his backpack." He concluded that, "Gotham! is decent, catchy, and entertaining, but can't keep up the pace it sets from the beginning, which is just too damn bad." Christina Rees of The Village Voice found the production tiring and derivative of bands like Gang of Four and The Clash and felt that Roman's performance failed to match that of John Lydon. She did give the band credit for creating a difficult sound that was a labor of love to them, concluding that, "The younger kids should enjoy the sound for the first time out, while new-wave nostalgiaheads can time travel. It's hard to dismiss such passionate effort. Just do me a favor and switch off the stereo on your way out."

== Track listing ==
All tracks are written by Radio 4.

US/AU version
No.	Title	Length
1.	"Our Town"	3:42
2.	"Start a Fire"	3:33
3.	"Eyes Wide Open"	3:42
4.	"Struggle"	3:13
5.	"Calling All Enthusiasts"	3:06
6.	"Save Your City"	3:08
7.	"Speaking in Codes"	4:14
8.	"Certain Tragedy"	3:30
9.	"Red Lights"	3:08
10.	"The Movies"	4:04
11.	"End of the Rope"	3:04
12.	"Pipe Bombs"	6:25
13.	"New Disco"	2:50

EU version
No.	Title	Length
1.	"Our Town"	3:42
2.	"Start a Fire"	3:33
3.	"Eyes Wide Open"	3:42
4.	"Dance to the Underground [New Version]"	4:52
5.	"Struggle"	3:13
6.	"Calling All Enthusiasts"	3:06
7.	"Save Your City"	3:08
8.	"Speaking in Codes"	4:14
9.	"Certain Tragedy"	3:30
10.	"The Movies"	4:04
11.	"End of the Rope"	3:04
12.	"Pipe Bombs"	6:25
13.	"New Disco"	2:50

Japanese version
No.	Title	Length
1.	"Our Town"	3:42
2.	"Start a Fire"	3:33
3.	"Eyes Wide Open"	3:42
5.	"Struggle"	3:13
6.	"Calling All Enthusiasts"	3:06
7.	"Save Your City"	3:08
8.	"Speaking in Codes"	4:14
9.	"Certain Tragedy"	3:30
10.	"The Movies"	4:04
11.	"End of the Rope"	3:04
12.	"Pipe Bombs"	6:25
13.	"New Disco"	2:50
14.	"Dance To The Underground [Original version produced by Tim O'Heir] - Bonus Track"	4:02
15.	"Dance To The Underground (The Good Finger Remix) - Bonus Track"	5:17

== Singles ==
Single Name	Release date	Chart position
"Dance To The Underground"	May 2001	UK #31
"Eyes Wide Open" (Europe only)	May 2002	did not chart
"Struggle"	May 2002	did not chart

== Personnel ==
=== Radio 4 ===
- Anthony Roman – bass, lead vocals
- Tommy Willians – guitars, vocals (lead vocals on "Eyes Wide Open" and "End Of The Rope")
- Gerard Garone – keyboards, guitars
- P.J. O'Conner – percussion, vocals
- Greg Collins – drums

=== Additional personnel ===
- James Murphy – production, vocals (on "Speaking In Codes")
- Tim Goldsworthy – production, sound engineering
