= High Society (Enon album) =

Studio album by Enon
- Released: June 4, 2002
- Recorded: March 2001-July 3, 2001
- Studio: RPM and the Industrial Building
- Genre: Indie rock; art pop
- Length: 41:24
- Label: Touch & Go
- Producer: Dave Sardy

Enon chronology
Believo! (2000)	High Society (2002)	Hocus Pocus (2003)

Singles from High Society
- 1. "In This City EP" Released: January 2003

High Society is the second album from the band Enon, released June 4, 2002, by Touch and Go Records. Originally meant to release on September 25, 2001, High Society was delayed once Enon's label, See Thru Broadcasting was closed after the September 11 attacks in New York City. The album received positive reviews from critics.

== Reception ==
Professional ratings
Aggregate scores
Source	Rating
Metacritic	74/100
Review scores
Source	Rating
AllMusic	4/5 stars
Pitchfork	8.8/10
Tiny Mix Tapes	4/5 stars

The album received largely positive reviews upon release. Rob Mitchum of Pitchfork gave the album a rating of 8.8/10, praising John Schmersal for "taking his first firm steps towards building an independent identity" separate from his previous band, Brainiac. Heather Phares of AllMusic gave 4/5 stars, praising the title song, "High Society" comparing it to music of the English rock band The Kinks.

== Track listing ==
No.	Title	Length
1.	"Old Dominion"	3:02
2.	"Count Sheep"	3:02
3.	"In This City"	4:01
4.	"Window Display"	3:11
5.	"Native Numb"	2:33
6.	"Leave It to Rust"	3:02
7.	"Disposable Parts"	1:54
8.	"Sold!"	2:21
9.	"Shoulder"	2:39
10.	"Pleasure and Privilege"	1:58
11.	"Natural Disasters"	2:49
12.	"Carbonation"	2:52
13.	"Salty"	2:27
14.	"High Society"	3:12
15.	"Diamond Raft"	2:21
Total length:		41:24
