= Crooks On Tape =

Indie rock band

- Origin: Los Angeles
- Genre: Indie rock
- Years active: 2010–2016
- Label: Misra
- Spinoffs: Vertical Scratchers
- Spinoff of: Enon
- Members: John Schmersal; Rick Lee; Joey Galvan
- Website: www.crooksontapemusic.com

Crooks On Tape is an indie rock band founded by John Schmersal (Braniac, Enon), Rick Lee (Skeleton Key), and drummer Joey Galvan. Schmersal and Lee played together in Enon and began recording improvisational music with Galvan in 2010. Dayton, Ohio indie label Misra Records released the band's debut album "Fingerprint" in 2013. Edited into a tight 35 minutes from "hundreds of hours of material," the band's official bio likens the band's electro-punk sound to "tiny snapshots of an altered crime scene."

AllMusic gave "Fingerprint 3 1/2 stars, citing the "unexplored mileage in the skronky yet catchy sound" of Enon's debut album as a key influence in Crooks On Tape's propensity to "hunt for the weirdest sounds possible and then put them in the hookiest songs they can write." Tiny Mix Tapes gave the album 3 out of 5 stars, calling "Fingerprint" a "squirming mass of improvisation...chopped up and molded into a series of two- to four-minute pop songs." Pitchfork's Matt LeMay cited album opener "Duper" as a favorite in his year-end feature My Year In Music, nodding to the "loose and off-the-cuff thing going on here that I keep coming back to."

Following the release of "Fingerprint," Crooks On Tape toured the U.S. and Europe in early 2014, when Schmersal turned his attention to a new project, Vertical Scratchers.

In 2014, Misra issued a cassette release of "Fingerprint" with a full 11 instrumental bonus tracks on the B-side. For Record Store Day 2015, Schmersal collected ten of these instrumentals for a vinyl compilation, In The Realm Of The Ancient Minor. The track list for this compilation mirrored the sequence of the "Fingerprint" cassette, omitting the song "Cats Don't Care."

In October 2015, Crooks On Tape resurfaced for a series of live gigs with Austin pop surrealists The Octopus Project.

== Discography ==
=== Albums ===
- 2013 Fingerprint CD and LP (Misra Records)
- 2014 Fingerprint cassette (Misra Records) (reissue with 11 bonus tracks)
- 2015 In The Realm Of The Ancient Minor LP (Pure Orgone) (limited release for Record Store Day)

=== Digital-only releases ===
- 2013 "The Trees" (remix of 1978 Rush classic) (SoundCloud)
