= Believo! =

Studio album by Enon
- Released: March 16, 2000
- Genre: Indie rock
- Length: 32:46; 37:35 (Bonus Tracks)
- Label: See Thru Broadcasting; Touch and Go Records (reissue)
- Producer: D Sardy

Enon chronology
Long Play (1998)	Believo! (2000)	High Society (2002)

Professional ratings
Review scores
Source	Rating
AllMusic	3/5 stars
Pitchfork	8.0/10
Pitchfork	8.4/10 (reissue)

Believo! is the debut studio album by the American indie rock band Enon. It was released in 2000 on See Thru Broadcasting. The second pressing of the vinyl edition included a bonus 7" record. The out-of-print album was reissued by Touch and Go Records in 2007 and 2023.

== Critical reception ==
Cincinnati CityBeat called the album "a rollicking slab of head-turning, style-juggling wax," writing that "a hydrant's flow of ideas percolate themselves into skewed pop songs." Exclaim! wrote that "with a disparate fusion of down and dirty guitar rock aesthetic, funky vibes and totally organic grooves, this NYC-based trio could well be the North American answer to the Beta Band." The Washington Post wrote that Believo! "is cutting-edge cut-up pop that surprises—in songs like 'Get the Letter Out'—by daring to be tuneful." The Stranger deemed it "a punchy, melody-packed blend of techno, new wave, and pop punk."

== Track listing ==
No.	Title	Length
1.	"Rubber Car"	2:31
2.	"Cruel"	2:33
3.	"Conjugate the Verbs"	3:12
4.	"Believo!"	2:08
5.	"Come Into"	3:14
6.	"Matters Gray"	3:25
7.	"Get the Letter Out"	2:55
8.	"World in a Jar"	3:16
9.	"For the Sum of It"	5:11
10.	"Elected"	1:41
11.	"Biofeedback"	2:40
Total length:		32:53

7" Bonus Tracks

No.	Title	Length
1.	"To Whom It May Consume"	2:45
2.	"Suz EQ"	1:57
Total length:		37:35

== Personnel ==
- John Schmersal - vocals, guitar
- Rick Lee - keyboard, guitar, double bass
- Steve Calhoon - drums, percussion

=== Production ===
- O-Matic Corp - Art Direction
- Nancy Nowacek - Design
- David Sardy - producer, mixing
- Greg Gordon, John Schmersal - engineering
