= The New Song & Dance =

The New Song and Dance

Studio album by Radio 4
- Released: May 16, 2000
- Recorded: November 1999 at Nu Mars Studios, Brooklyn, New York City, NY
- Genre: Dance-punk; Post-punk revival
- Length: 33:47
- Label: Gern Blandsten
- Producer: Tim O'Heir

Radio 4 chronology
The New Song and Dance (2000)	Gotham! (2002)

Professional ratings
Review scores
Source	Rating
AllMusic	3.5/5 stars
The Encyclopedia of Popular Music	3/5 stars
Pitchfork Media	6.3/10

The New Song and Dance is the debut album by the dance-punk/post-punk revival band Radio 4, released in 2000.

The album was recorded cheaply, making for a messy but angry and fast sound. The New Song and Dance was mildly successful with critics, who likened the album's sound to that of the Clash.

== Track list ==
All songs written and performed by Radio 4.

1. "How the Stars Got Crossed" – 3:42
2. "Buy and Sell" – 3:35
3. "We Must Be Sure" – 3:13
4. "Boy Meets Girl" – 3:15
5. "Beat Around the Bush" – 2:50
6. "Get Set to Fall Out" – 2:23
7. "Election Day" – 3:22
8. "Walls Falling" – 2:58
9. "(No More Room for) Communication" – 2:55
10. "Beautiful Ride" – 2:56
11. "New Motive" – 3:06

== Personnel ==
- Anthony Roman – bass, lead vocals (Roman is Radio 4's official lead vocalist)
- Tommy Williams – guitars, vocals (lead vocals on "Buy and Sell", "Boy Meets Girl", "Get Set To Fall Out", "Walls Falling" and "Communication")
- Greg Collins – drums, vocals
- Tim O'Heir – production, percussion
- Ross Totino – keyboard (though not actually a member of Radio 4)
