= Hissing Prigs in Static Couture =

Studio album by Brainiac
- Released: March 26, 1996
- Studios: Water Music, Hoboken
- Genres: Indie rock; synthpunk; noise rock; dance-punk; art punk; post-hardcore
- Length: 34:35
- Label: Touch & Go
- Producers: Eli Janney; Steve Albini

Brainiac chronology
Internationale (1995)	Hissing Prigs in Static Couture (1996)	Electro-Shock for President (1997)

Hissing Prigs in Static Couture (stylised as H1551NG PR195 1N 5TAT1C COUTUR3) is the third and final studio album by American indie rock band Brainiac, released on March 26, 1996. It is the band's second release through Touch and Go Records, following the 1995 EP Internationale. The album incorporates more electronics than previous Brainiac releases, and hints towards the more synth-based electropunk style of the 1997 EP Electro-Shock for President.

== Background and recording ==
In an interview with Seconds magazine, Brainiac frontman Tim Taylor stated that the band sought "to make pop music that sounded futuristic so it wouldn’t sound dated." The band also incorporated a "70's fashion band" aesthetic around the time the album was in production, wearing gaudy outfits for their live performances.

The album was predominately recorded at Water Music in Hoboken, New Jersey, with producer and engineer Eli Janney, who had also worked on Brainiac's 1994 album Bonsai Superstar. The track "Nothing Ever Changes" was recorded by Steve Albini in his basement. The album was mixed at Oz Recording in Baltimore. A music video for the track "Vincent Come On Down" was produced.

== Reception ==
Professional ratings
Review scores
Source	Rating
AllMusic	4.5/5 stars
Alternative Press	4/5 stars
The Encyclopedia of Popular Music	3/5 stars
MusicHound Rock	4.5/5 stars
NME	7/10
Pitchfork	8.0/10
Q	4/5 stars
Select	3/5 stars
Tiny Mix Tapes	4/5 marks

Hissing Prigs in Static Couture received much acclaim from critics and fans and is considered one of the band's best recordings, alongside Bonsai Superstar. In a contemporary review of the album for CMJ New Music Monthly, Jenny Eliscu described Brainiac as "Saturday Night Fever gone punk". Retrospectively, Magnet described it as a "lost classic", while Wondering Sound's Yancey Strickler referred to it as "the band's undisputed masterpiece".

Pitchfork ranked Hissing Prigs in Static Couture at number 73 on its list of the top 100 albums of the 1990s in 2000. It was also included in the site's 2006 list of the 25 best albums on Touch and Go. NME included the album in its list of five albums with production by Steve Albini that they considered to be "essential", referring to Brainiac as "one of the most brain-bustingly unique [bands] the rock underground has ever seen".

== Track listing ==
No.	Title	Length
1.	"Indian Poker (Part 3)"	0:51
2.	"Pussyfootin'"	2:36
3.	"Vincent Come On Down"	2:34
4.	"This Little Piggy"	3:51
5.	"Strung"	2:10
6.	"Hot Seat Can't Sit Down"	3:10
7.	"The Vulgar Trade"	1:44
8.	"Beekeeper's Maxim"	2:53
9.	"Kiss Me, U Jacked Up Jerk"	3:13
10.	"70 Kg Man"	3:32
11.	"Indian Poker (Part 2)"	0:45
12.	"Nothing Ever Changes"	2:42
13.	"I Am a Cracked Machine"	4:34
Total length:		34:35

All song titles are stylized in all caps. All I's, E's, S's and G's are stylised as 1's, 3's, 5's, and 9's, respectively.

== Personnel ==
Brainiac

- Tim Taylor – vocals, keyboards
- John Schmersal – guitars
- Juan Monasterio – bass guitar
- Tyler Trent – drums

Production

- Eli Janney – production, recording, engineering
- Steve Albini – recording, production ("Nothing Ever Changes")
- Jeff Gattens – engineer
- Mike Rippe – assistant engineer
