= Sultans of Sentiment =

Studio album by the Van Pelt
- Released: 1997
- Genre: Indie rock, emo
- Length: 37:24
- Label: Gern Blandsten Records
- Producer: Alap Momin

The Van Pelt chronology
Stealing From Our Favorite Thieves (1996)	Sultans of Sentiment (1997)	Imaginary Third (2014)

Professional ratings
Review scores
Source	Rating
AllMusic	4/5 stars
NME	7/10

Sultans of Sentiment is the second album by the indie rock band the Van Pelt, released in 1997. In 2014, the album was remastered and reissued by La Castanya Records.

== Critical reception ==
AllMusic wrote that "their formula works brilliantly on this ten-track CD, with Chris Leo's grueling spoken vocals clearly paving the way for the evocative rock the rest of the band contributes." Vulture.com described "Nanzen Kills a Cat" as "a near-perfect encapsulation" of the emo genre.

== Track listing ==
1. "Nanzen Kills A Cat" - 4:14
2. "The Good, The Bad & The Blind" - 4:30
3. "Yamato (Where People Really Die)" - 2:57
4. "My Bouts With Pouncing" - 3:00
5. "Don't Make Me Walk My Own Log" - 3:56
6. "The Young Alchemists" - 4:04
7. "We Are The Heathens" - 3:20
8. "Pockets Of Pricks" - 2:44
9. "Let's Make A List" - 3:33
10. "Do The Lovers Still Meet At The Chiang Kai-Shek Memorial?" - 5:06

== Personnel ==
- Brian Maryansky
- Chris Leo
- Neil O'Brien
- Sean P. Greene
