= Lab Partners =

- Origin: Dayton, Ohio, United States
- Genres: Shoegazing, dream pop, indie rock
- Years active: 1998–present
- Labels: Big Beef, Reverb
- Members: Mike Smith; Mike Volk; Amy Smith
- Past members: Matt Schulz; Kevin Parrett; Ian Kaplan; Todd Carll; Kevin Vaughn
- Website: labpartners.net

Lab Partners are an American shoegazing band from Dayton, Ohio.

== History ==
Lab Partners first formed in Dayton in 1998 by Mike Smith, Amy Smith and Matt Schulz of the band Honeyburn and Kevin Parrett of Ten O'Clock Scholar. After releasing two EPs in 1999 and 2002, drummer Matt Schulz left the group to join Enon. He was replaced with Ian Kaplan, and the group released its first full-length, Daystar, in 2002 to critical acclaim. After Daystar's release, Mike Volk (another Honeyburn veteran) replaced Parrett on guitar and Todd Carll took over for Kaplan on drums. Appearances at SXSW and several tours around the US followed over the next several years, as well as another LP and EP. Moonlight Music was released in 2010 and featured Kevin Vaughn (Heartless Bastards) on drums.

== Members ==
Current members

- Mike Smith – vocals, guitar
- Mike Volk – guitar
- Amy Smith – keyboards, bass
- Jim McPherson - drums (from the Breeders)

Former members

- Matt Schulz – drums
- Kevin Parrett – guitar
- Ian Kaplan – drums
- Todd Carll – drums
- Kevin Vaughn – drums

== Discography ==
Studio albums

- Daystar (2002, Big Beef Records)
- Wicked Branches (2005, Reverb Records)
- Moonlight Music (2010, Pravda Records)
- Seven Seas (2014, Pravda Records)
- Mind Control (2020, Pravda Records)

EPs

- Lab Partners EP (1999, Self-released)
- Turn It On EP (2000, Self-released)
- Keep Quiet EP (2007, Reverb Records)
