= Addicted to Bad Ideas =

Addicted to Bad Ideas: Peter Lorre's Twentieth Century

Studio album by The World/Inferno Friendship Society
- Released: September 11, 2007
- Recorded: 2006–2007
- Genre: Punk cabaret
- Length: 35:22
- Label: Chunksaah Records
- Producer: Don Fury

The World/Inferno Friendship Society chronology
Red-Eyed Soul (2006)	Addicted to Bad Ideas: Peter Lorre's Twentieth Century (2007)	The Anarchy and the Ecstasy (2011)

Professional ratings
Review scores
Source	Rating
Punknews.org	4.5/5 stars
AllMusic	3.5/5 stars

Addicted to Bad Ideas is the fifth album by the World/Inferno Friendship Society, and their second for Chunksaah Records. Subtitled "Peter Lorre's Twentieth Century", the release is a concept album inspired by the life and films of actor Peter Lorre.

Lead singer Jack Terricloth described Lorre as "a strangely charismatic, extremely creepy person, which I think most punk rockers can identify with ... It’s the lure of the other. He’s the underdog, the outsider." Many of the album's lyrics are taken directly from movie dialogues, notable Lorre quotes, and from the biography The Lost One: A Life of Peter Lorre by Stephen D. Youngkin. The track title, "Everybody Comes to Rick's" is a reference to "Rick's Café Américain" from the film Casablanca. In addition, the album's cover art is an homage to Lorre's renowned film M.

This album was developed into a dramatic multimedia production directed by Jay Scheib. In 2009 World Inferno performed this work at festivals such as Public Theater's Under the Radar Festival, Philadelphia's Live Arts Festival, Montclair State University's Peak Performances series, and South Carolina's Spoleto Festival USA. Jack Terricloth commented, "the producer asked me if we were ever going to pay him back. We said 'No!'"

The songs "Peter Lorre Overture" and "Heart Attack '64" are reworked versions of tracks from Just the Best Party, and "Ich erinnere mich an die Weimarer Republik" is reworked from East Coast Super Sound Punk of Today.

== Track listing ==
1. Peter Lorre Overture – 4:45
2. With a Good Criminal Heart – 2:55
3. "M" is for Morphine – 3:01
4. ...and Embarked on a Life of Poverty and Freedom... – 3:32
5. Ich erinnere mich an die Weimarer Republik – 4:13
6. I Just Make Faces – 2:45
7. Everybody Comes to Rick's – 2:05
8. Cathy Catharine – 2:49
9. Thumb Cinema – 3:23
10. Addicted to Bad Ideas – 3:14
11. Heart Attack '64 – 2:40
