= Stealing From Our Favorite Thieves =

Studio album by The Van Pelt
- Released: 1996
- Genre: Indie rock, emo, post-hardcore
- Label: Gern Blandsten Records
- Producer: The Van Pelt

The Van Pelt chronology
Stealing From Our Favorite Thieves (1996)	Sultans of Sentiment (1997)

Stealing From Our Favorite Thieves is the first full-length album by The Van Pelt, an indie rock band from New York City, released in 1996.

== Track listing ==
1. His Steppe Is My Prairie
2. It's A Suffering
3. Shame On You
4. Magic Fantasy (We Are Provincial)
5. You Are The Glue
6. Simone Never Had It This Good
7. His Saxophone Is My Guitar
8. It's New To Me
9. Turning Twenty Into Two

== Personnel ==
- Toko Yasuda (bass, backing vocals)
- Neil O'Brien (drums)
- Chris Leo (vocals, guitar, lyrics)
- David Baum (guitar, backing vocals)
