= The Dream That Stuff Was Made Of =

Studio album by Starlight Mints
- Released: August 22, 2000
- Genre: Indie pop
- Length: 35:45
- Label: See Thru Broadcasting
- Producer: Dave Sardy, Allan Vest, Andy Nunez

Starlight Mints chronology
The Dream That Stuff Was Made Of (2000)	Built on Squares (2003)

Professional ratings
Review scores
Source	Rating
AllMusic	3/5 stars
Robert Christgau	B+
Entertainment Weekly	C+

The Dream That Stuff Was Made Of is the debut studio album by the indie pop band Starlight Mints.

The title references the line "The stuff that dreams are made of" from The Maltese Falcon, and, second-handedly, Shakespeare: In Act IV of The Tempest, Prospero says "We are such stuff / As dreams are made on, and our little life / Is rounded with a sleep."

== Production ==
The album was recorded in 1997 and 1998, years before it was released by See Thru Broadcasting.

== Critical reception ==
Pitchfork called the album "a short, well-sequenced offering of punchy orchestral pop." The Houston Press wrote that the album "offers honest-to-God anthems with catchy refrains that sound happy even when they aren't."

== Track listing ==
No.	Title	Length
1.	"Submarine #3"	1:58
2.	"The Bandit"	2:26
3.	"Sir Prize"	3:10
4.	"Blinded By You"	4:01
5.	"Valerie Flames"	3:28
6.	"Sugar Blaster"	3:05
7.	"Cracker Jack"	4:49
8.	"Matador"	2:08
9.	"The Twilight Showdown"	3:03
10.	"Margarita"	3:48
11.	"Pulling Out My Hair"	3:56
12.	"Popsickle"	3:03
13.	"Pusher Girls"	3:42
