= Toko Yasuda =

Japanese musician

- Yasuda performing with St. Vincent in 2018

Background information
- Also known as: Plvs Vltra, Kotokoto
- Genres: Rock, Electronics, Experimental
- Occupations: Singer, songwriter, musician
- Instruments: Bass, guitar, keyboards
- Years active: 1992–present
- Labels: Touch and Go Records; Spectrum Spools Records
- Formerly of: Blonde Redhead; The Van Pelt; The Lapse; Enon

Toko Yasuda is a Japanese singer, songwriter, keyboardist, guitarist, and bassist, best known as a member of New York indie rock band Enon and as a member of St. Vincent and Cate Le Bon's backing bands.

== Life and career ==
Yasuda grew up in the cities of Fujisawa and Kamakura. Her father was once a dōshu of Aikido. She moved to New York City in 1992, and lived there until 2006.

Yasuda has played in the bands The Lapse and The Van Pelt before their disbandment, and had a brief stint in Blonde Redhead. After that Toko appeared in the band Enon from 1999 to 2007.

Yasuda plays bass guitar, electronic keyboards, electric guitar and sings. Welsh singer/songwriter Cate le Bon noted "She has the voice of a beautiful, icy ghost; it might be the spookiest thing I've ever heard."

Yasuda currently resides in Los Angeles and formerly she briefly lived in Philadelphia, after being priced out of both Manhattan and Brooklyn. The New York Times profiled Enon's move to Philadelphia as indication of a greater phenomenon of transplanted New Yorkers to the "sixth borough".

In 2012, Yasuda released the album Parthenon under the pseudonym Plvs Vltra. Parthenon is Yasuda's first solo album, featuring collaborations with Danny Ray Thompson of the Sun Ra Arkestra, Scott Allen of Thunderbirds Are Now, and John Schmersal, also of Enon, who produced the album. Mike Reid from the music webzine Tiny Mix Tapes described the album as "a straight-up pop album with alluring (because “sexy” sounds misogynist and creepy) female vocals". She has released her latest Ambient album Institute under the pseudonym Kotokoto in 2018.

Yasuda is featured on Cate le Bon's Album Mug Museum (vocals), and on the song "Masseduction" on St.Vincent's 2017 fifth studio album Masseduction which won the award for Best Recording Package and Best Rock Song for its title track, and was also nominated for the Best Alternative Music Album. She also appeared on the track "Gimme A Chance" on Azealia Banks' 2014 debut album Broke With Expensive Taste which was sampled from a song "Knock That Door" on the album Lost Marbles & Exploded Evidence from the band Enon in 2005.

Yasuda toured with St. Vincent through the Strange Mercy Tour (2011-12), the Digital Witness Tour (2014-15) - (supporting the album St. Vincent), and through the "I Am A Lot Like You" tour (2018-19) - (supporting the album Masseduction). She provided electric bass, keyboards, guitar and backing vocals. In 2019, she was brought in as a touring keyboardist for Sleater-Kinney to perform songs from the band's new album The Center Won't Hold, and again in 2024 for their album Little Rope. In February 2022 she played bass guitar on Cate le Bon's Pompeii US and Europe tour.

== Discography ==
- Parthenon (2012) (as PLVS VLTRA)
- Yo-Yo Blue (2013) (as PLVS VLTRA)
- Rooftop Arcade/Mesopotamia (2013) (as PLVS VLTRA)
- Institute (2018) (as Kotokoto)
