= The Anarchy and the Ecstasy =

Studio album by World/Inferno Friendship Society
- Released: March 15, 2011
- Recorded: 2010
- Genre: Punk
- Length: 34:58
- Label: Chunksaah Records
- Producer: Dan Shatzky

World/Inferno Friendship Society chronology
Addicted to Bad Ideas	The Anarchy and the Ecstasy	This Packed Funeral

Professional ratings
Review scores
Source	Rating
Punknews.org	4.5/5 stars
The Phoenix (newspaper)	2.5/4 stars

The Anarchy and the Ecstasy is an album released by the World/Inferno Friendship Society on March 15, 2011. It is their fifth full-length album. Three members left the group between the previous release and Anarchy.

Before the album's release, many demos were available online. Jack Terricloth commented, "I couldn't care less about the demos. Songs want to be free. Songs want you to whistle them!" Musically, this album is more eclectic than most of their previous work, with significant bluegrass influence.

The lead singer, Jack Terricloth, claimed the title of the album was taken from a William Butler Yeats poem, but did not identify which one.

== Track listing ==
1. "I Am Sick of People Being Sick of My Shit"
2. "The Disarming Smile"
3. "Canonize Philip K. Dick, Ok"
4. "Thirteen Years Without Peter King"
5. "They Talk of Nora's Badness"
6. "The Politics of Passing Out"
7. "Jake and Eggers"
8. "Lean Times for Heroes"
9. "The Apple Was Eve"
10. "The Mighty Raritan"
