= Enemies Like This =

Studio album by Radio 4
- Released: May 16, 2006
- Recorded: New York City, 2006
- Genre: Dance-punk, post-punk revival
- Length: 41:43
- Label: Astralwerks Records

Radio 4 chronology
Stealing of a Nation (2004)	Enemies Like This (2006)

Singles from Enemies Like This
- 1. "Enemies Like This" Released: May 2006; 2. "Packing Things up on the Scene" Released: October 2006; 3. "As Far As the Eye Can See" Released: 2006 / 2007

Enemies Like This is the fourth LP by the New York City dance-punk band Radio 4. It was released on May 16, 2006.

== Critical reception ==
Professional ratings
Aggregate scores
Source	Rating
Metacritic	55/100
Review scores
Source	Rating
Allmusic	2.5/5 stars
DIY	3/5 stars
Drowned in Sound	3/10
Gigwise	2.5/5 stars
MusicOMH	1/5 stars
Pitchfork	3.6/10

Enemies Like This was met with "mixed or average" reviews from critics. At Metacritic, which assigns a weighted average rating out of 100 to reviews from mainstream publications, this release received an average score of 55 based on 16 reviews.

Writing for AllMusic, Rob Theakston wrote: "While there are glimpses of this progression on Enemies Like This, they're all too few and far between to merit this album as anything but stagnant." At Drowned in Sound, Rob Webb gave the album a three out of ten, explaining "Radio 4's latest LP would have been welcomed with open arms by those in search of a quick 'n' dirty punk-funk fix. But now, with the genre oversaturated beyond belief, bands need to produce something special and original to stand out from the crowd. Radio 4 fail to do that."

== Track listing ==
No.	Title	Length
1.	"Enemies Like This"	4:21
2.	"Packing Things Up on the Scene"	4:15
3.	"Too Much To Ask For"	3:12
4.	"Grass Is Greener"	3:56
5.	"Everything's In Question"	4:21
6.	"This Is Not A Test"	4:58
7.	"Ascension Street"	3:32
8.	"(Always A) Target"	3:43
9.	"All In Control"	4:28
10.	"As Far As The Eye Can See"	4:57
