= Packing Things Up on the Scene =

Single by Radio 4

from the album Enemies Like this
- Released: October 2006
- Recorded: 2006
- Label: Astralwerks/EMI
- Songwriter(s): Anthony Roman, Greg Collins, P.J. O'Connor, Dave Milone, Gerard Garone

Radio 4 singles chronology
"Enemies Like this" (2006)	"Packing Things Up on the Scene" (2006)	"As Far as the Eye Can See" (2007)

"Packing Things Up on the Scene" is a song by Brooklyn-based band Radio 4. It was released as the second single from their 2006 album Enemies Like This. A music video was also released, with director Tim Sutton.

== Track listing ==
Mini CD

1. Packing Things up on the Scene (Radio Edit)
2. Pretty Good Lie

7" vinyl

1. Packing Things up on the Scene (Album version)
2. Take Anything

12" vinyl

1. Packing Things Up On The Scene (The Loving Hand remix)
2. Packing Things Up On The Scene (The Loving Hand instrumental)
- All tracks available for download on iTunes.

== Music video ==
The song features a music video, directed by Tim Sutton. In the video, the band starts playing in a room among some young people on sofa, watching on TV, an army incident in the streets of an unspecified city. After, the band members go out to the streets and see a lot of people laying on the floor, suffering from some wound. They go back to the room they were before, and the young people are also laying on the floor, fainted. The video ends with the closing of the TV screen.
