= Radio 4 (band) =

American punk band

- Origin: Brooklyn, New York, U.S.
- Genres: Dance-punk; post-punk revival; alternative rock; new rave
- Years active: 1999–2012
- Labels: Astralwerks, City Slang, Gern Blandsten
- Members: Anthony Roman; Greg Collins; P.J. O'Connor; Dave Milone
- Past members: Gerard Garone; Anthony Rizzo; Tommy Williams

Radio 4 were an American punk band based in Brooklyn, New York. Formed in 1999, they claimed their music is "made in New York, is about New York, and sounds like New York".

== History ==
=== Early years ===
The band was formed in 1999 as a trio comprising Anthony Roman (vocals/bass), Tommy Williams (guitar/vocals) and Greg Collins (drums). The three had been friends growing up in Long Island, where they had been involved in the hardcore scene, appearing in bands such as Garden Variety (Roman) and Sleepasaurus. They initially formed the band under the influence of late 1970s/early 1980s punk and post-punk, recording a three-track EP which was released on New Jersey's Gern Blandsten label.

Their first album The New Song & Dance was released in 2000, produced by Tim O'Heir. This record was a low-budget, gritty rock album with a slightly retro sound, drawing comparisons to The Clash in particular. Around this time Anthony Roman opened a record store in Brooklyn which became a focus for the emerging scene, and the first album was followed by the Dance to the Underground EP, also produced by O'Heir. A dance remix of the title track became a club hit and was used in a Mitsubishi advert, indicating a new direction for the band's sound.

=== Gotham! and mainstream success ===
The band subsequently became a five-piece, comprising Roman, Collins, David Milone (Vocals/Guitar) (who replaced original guitarist/singer Tommy Williams in 2005), Gerard Garone (Keyboards), and P.J. O'Connor (Percussion), and teamed up with James Murphy and Tim Goldsworthy's DFA Productions to produce their second album. This collaboration signalled a new direction for the band, merging the guitar punk of their first album with electronic and dance music influences to create a dance-punk sound similar to other DFA-affiliated artists such as The Rapture. Gotham! was released in 2002 on Gern Blandsten, described as "half dance party, half political rally", leading the band to mainstream recognition and international success.

The band recorded their third album, Stealing of a Nation, in a basement studio in Brooklyn with Max Heyes, and it was released in September 2004, to a poor critical reception. A fourth album entitled Enemies Like This followed in 2006.

Gerard Garone left the band in April 2008. They last appeared together as a full band at the CBGB Festival in New York in 2012. Roman and Milone still occasionally perform together as Orange Cassettes along with former members of Elefant.

== Influences ==
They cite a variety of influences, including Gang of Four, Mission of Burma, Primal Scream and Zero Zero, though their lively punk sound combined with their militant political stance has drawn a strong comparison with The Clash.

Their name comes from a Public Image Ltd. song from that group's second album, which is itself a reference to BBC Radio 4.

== Discography ==
=== Studio albums ===
- The New Song & Dance (2000)
- Gotham! (2002)
- Stealing of a Nation (2004)
- Enemies Like This (2006)

=== EPs ===
- Dance to the Underground (June 2001, Gern Blandsten Records)
- Electrify (August 2004, Astralwerks)
- Enemies Like This Remixes (September 2006, Astralwerks)
- Packing Things Up on the Scene (October 2006, Astralwerks/EMI)

=== Singles ===
- "Beat Around the Bush" (1999, Gern Blandsten Records)
- "Dance to the Underground" (June 2001, City Slang) – UK No. 94
- "Struggle" (May 2002, City Slang) – UK No. 84
- "Eyes Wide Open" (May 2002, City Slang) – UK No. 182
- "Start a Fire" (August 2003, City Slang) – UK No. 130
- "Party Crashers" (July 2004, Astralwerks/City Slang) – UK No. 75
- "Absolute Affirmation" (September 2004, City Slang) – UK No. 61
- "State of Alert" (November 2004, City Slang) – UK No. 121
- "Transmission" (March 2005, City Slang) – UK No. 153
- "Enemies Like This" (May 2006, Astralwerks) – UK No. 162
- "Packing Things Up on the Scene" (October 2006, Astralwerks/EMI) – UK No. 175
- "As Far as the Eye Can See" (August 2007, Astralwerks/EMI)

== Songs in other media ==
- "Party Crashers" in Project Gotham Racing 3
- Radio 4's song, "Caroline" is featured in "Rooney – Heart" in Nike's Joga Bonito series of advertisements.
- "Dance to the Underground" is featured in the musical score of Grandma's Boy, produced by Adam Sandler's production company Happy Madison in 2006.
- "Start a Fire" from the album Gotham! has been featured in Warren Miller's Journey, and commercials for FX's show Rescue Me
- "Enemies Like This" has been featured in commercials for the National Geographic Channel's documentary series Critical Situation.
- "Calling All Enthusiasts" was used in commercials for the new Schwinn Sting-Ray bikes in 2004.
- A pre-release version of "Give it to Me" was featured in Sharpie marker's TV commercial with David Beckham in the summer of 2008.
