= Justamustache =

Studio album by Thunderbirds Are Now!
- Released: March 22, 2005
- Recorded: Tempermill Studios, Ferndale, Michigan
- Genre: Post-punk revival, new wave
- Length: 33:59
- Label: Frenchkiss
- Producer: Dave Feeny

Thunderbirds Are Now! chronology
Doctor, lawyer, Indian Chief (2003)	Justamustache (2005)	Necks EP (2005)

Professional ratings
Review scores
Source	Rating
Allmusic	link
Pitchfork Media	(8.0/10) Mar 17, 2005
PopMatters	link
Prefix	Mar 22, 2005
Stylus	(B−) Apr 11, 2005

Justamustache is the 2005 album released by Detroit-based post-punk revival band, Thunderbirds Are Now! The album was released by Frenchkiss Records.

== Track listing ==
1. "Better Safe Than Safari" – 2:36
2. "Eat This City" – 2:47
3. "198090" – 3:44
4. "Aquatic Cupid's Harpoons of Love" – 2:57
5. "Enough About Me, Let's Talk About Me" – 3:21
6. "To: Skulls" – 3:15
7. "From: Skulls" – 4:19
8. "Bodies Adjust" – 3:25
9. "This World Is Made of Paper" – 3:33
10. "Cobra Feet" – 4:02

== Personnel ==
- Martin Smith – bass, cowbell
- Ryan Allen – guitars, vocals, live drums & piano on "Bodies Adjust"
- Michael Durgan – snare, cymbals, bass drum, toms
- Scott Allen – keyboards, sequencer, samples, vocals, percussion
- Shannon McCarthy– singers on "Eat This City" / Vocalist and writer of opening and closing tracks
- Dave Feeny - Producer, Engineer, Mixing
