= East Coast Super Sound Punk of Today! =

East Coast Super Sound Punk of Today'

Compilation album by The World/Inferno Friendship Society
- Released: May 16, 2000
- Recorded: 1994 – 1999
- Genre: Punk cabaret
- Label: Gern Blandsten

The World/Inferno Friendship Society chronology
The True Story of the Bridgewater Astral League (1997)	East Coast Super Sound Punk of Today' (2000)	Just the Best Party (2002)

East Coast Super Sound Punk of Today! is a compilation album by The World/Inferno Friendship Society. It features all but one of the songs from their first four singles plus one previously unreleased track. The missing song is "Nothing You Begin" from the "Tattoos Fade" single.

Professional ratings
Review scores
Source	Rating
Allmusic	link
Pitchfork Media	link

== Track listing ==
No.	Title	Originally appeared on	Length
1.	"Tattoos Fade"	"Tattoos Fade"	5:12
2.	"The Models and the Mannequins"	"The Models and the Mannequins"	3:09
3.	"Glamour Ghouls"	"The Models and the Mannequins"	3:08
4.	"Our Candidate"	"Our Candidate"	3:15
5.	"All of California and Everyone Who Lives There Stinks"	"Our Candidate"	3:34
6.	"Jeffrey Lee"	previously unreleased	2:20
7.	"Pumpkin Time"	"Pumpkin Time"	5:12
8.	"Ich errinere mich an Weimar"	"Pumpkin Time"	3:56
