= The Little Killers =

American rock and roll band

- Origin: New York City, New York
- Years active: 2001–2007
- Labels: Crypt, Gern Blandsten
- Past members: Andy Maltz; Sara Nelson; Kari Boden

The Little Killers were an American rock and roll band who formed in New York City in 2001. They played punk-influenced garage rock inspired by such artists as Chuck Berry, the New York Dolls, and Johnny Burnette's Rock & Roll Trio.

The band members were Andy Maltz (lead vocals and guitar), Sara Nelson (bass and backing vocals) and Kari Boden (drums and backing vocals).

After signing to Crypt Records, The Little Killers released their self-titled debut album in September 2003. They also released two non-album singles, "Better Be Right" (2003) and "You Got It Made" (2004). In 2004 they played one of the final Peel Sessions broadcasts from the John Peel radio show.

In 2006, they released their second and final album, A Real Good One, on the Gern Blandsten Records label.

The Little Killers toured extensively in the US, Europe, and Australia before disbanding in 2007.
