= Starlight Mints =

American indie pop band

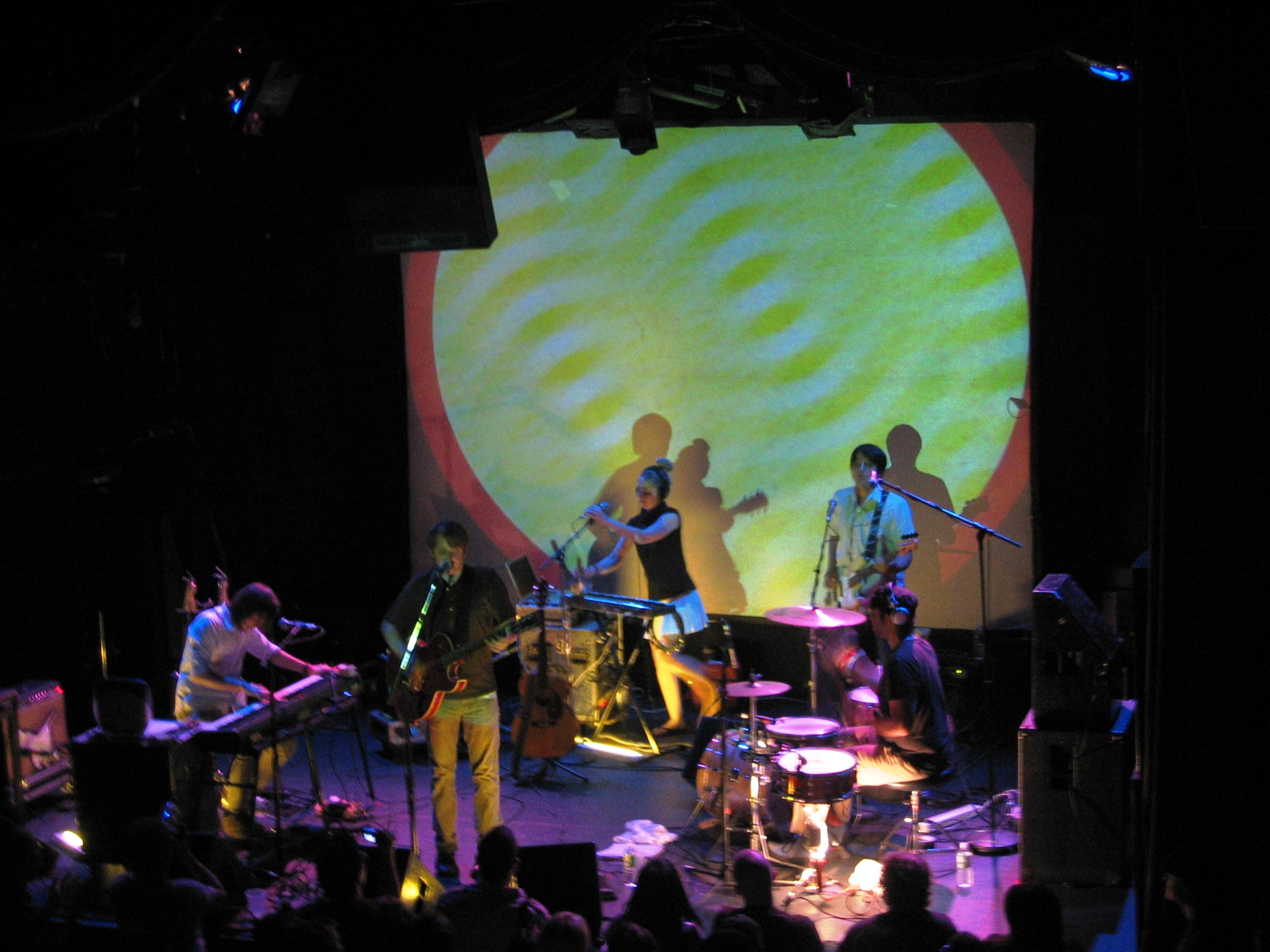
- Starlight Mints performing at the Bowery Ballroom, June 12, 2006

Background information
- Origin: Norman, Oklahoma, United States
- Genres: Indie rock, Indie pop
- Years active: 1998–2009
- Labels: See Thru Broadcasting, Pias America, Barsuk Records
- Members: Allan Vest; Marian Love Nunez; Javier Gonzales; Andy Nunez; Ryan Lindsey
- Past members: Kevin McElhaney; Matt Goad; James Honderich; Mary Beth Leigh; Kure Croker
- Website: www.starlightmints.com

Starlight Mints were an American indie pop band from Norman, Oklahoma, United States. The band was formed in the 1990s and released four albums during the 2000s, after which they disbanded. Their last lineup consisted of Allan Vest (vocals, guitar), Andy Nunez (drums), Marian Love Nunez (keyboard), Ryan Lindsey (keyboards/guitar) and Javier Gonzales (bass). Five previous members (Kevin McElhaney, James Honderich, Mary Beth Leigh, Kure Croker, and Matt Goad) contributed to their sound on violin, cello, bass, voice, and drums.

The Starlight Mints signed with Barsuk Records in December 2005 and released their first album with the record label (Drowaton) on April 25, 2006.

An extract of the band's single "Eyes of the Night" was the theme tune for ITV1 2009 supernatural drama Demons.

Starlight Mints played their last show on December 23, 2009 at Opolis. Vocalist/Guitarist Allan Vest continues to work as a music producer and film and television score composer. Vest started doubleVee, a new project with his partner Barb Hendrickson, in 2012. Drummer Andy Nunez and keyboardist Marian Love Nunez formed a new band called A.M.P. that same year. Guitarist/keyboardist Ryan Lindsey continues to perform both as a solo artist and with the band Broncho. Drummer Andy Nunez owns and operates the Opolis, an indie rock venue in Norman, Oklahoma. The venue hosts both local and national acts.

== Last lineup ==
- Allan Vest (vocals/guitar)
- Marian Love Nunez (keyboards)
- Javier Gonzales (bass)
- Andy Nunez (drums)
- Ryan Lindsey (keyboards/guitar)

== Discography ==
=== Studio albums ===
- The Dream That Stuff Was Made Of (August 22, 2000)
- Built on Squares (May 20, 2003)
- Drowaton (April 25, 2006)
- Change Remains (July 21, 2009)

=== Live albums ===
- Starlight Mints Live At the Casbah (April 3, 2004)

=== Other appearances ===
- Barnyard (Music from the Motion Picture) (August 9, 2006) (song: "Popsickle")
- National Lampoon's Van Wilder: The Rise of Taj (song: "Eyes of the Night")
- Demons (song: "Eyes of the Night")

== See also ==
- Indie music
- Indie pop
