= Another One Hypnotized By... =

EP by Thunderbirds Are Now!
- Released: April 1, 2003
- Genre: Post punk
- Label: Acutest Records

Thunderbirds Are Now! chronology
| Thunderbirds Are Now! (2002) | Another One Hypnotized By... (2003) | Doctor, Lawyer, Indian Chief (2003) |

Another One Hypnotized By... is an EP by the band Thunderbirds Are Now!. It was released by Acutest Records on April 1, 2003.

== Track listing ==
1. "It's the End of the World, and I'm Still a Virgin"
2. "My Girl Is a Beard"
3. "Ingram St. Massacre (t-i 82 Remix)"
4. "New Wave Mom"
5. "Last Sandwich for Sanchez"
