= Stealing of a Nation =

Studio album by Radio 4
- Released: September 7, 2004
- Recorded: New York, New York
- Genre: Dance Punk
- Label: Astralwerks Records
- Producer: Max Heyes

Radio 4 chronology
Gotham! (2001)	Stealing of a Nation (2004)	Enemies Like This (2006)

Professional ratings
Aggregate scores
Source	Rating
Metacritic	48/100
Review scores
Source	Rating
AllMusic	2/5 stars
Drowned in Sound	8/10
The Guardian	2/5 stars
NME	7/10
Pitchfork	2.1/10
Rolling Stone	2/5 stars
Spin	C+
Stylus	5/10
Tiny Mix Tapes	4.5/5 stars
URB	3/5 stars

Stealing of a Nation is the third LP by the New York City Dance-punk band Radio 4. It was released on September 7, 2004.

== Track listing ==
1. Party Crashers
2. Transmission
3. State of Alert
4. FRA Type 1 & II
5. The Death of American Radio
6. Nation
7. No Reaction
8. Absolute Affirmation
9. (Give Me All of Your) Money
10. Shake the Foundation
11. Dismiss the Sound
12. Coming Up Empty
