= Necks (EP) =

EP by Thunderbirds Are Now!
- Released: 2005
- Genre: Post-punk revival, new wave
- Length: 16:39
- Label: Conspirators in Sound

Thunderbirds Are Now! chronology
| Justamustache (2005) | Necks (2005) | Make History (2006) |

Professional ratings
Review scores
| Source | Rating |
|---|---|
| Allmusic | 3/5 stars |

Necks is an EP by Thunderbirds Are Now! The album was released by Conspirators in Sound on May 24, 2005.

== Track listing ==
1. "Essentially, It's A Viking Funeral Hymn For Those Whom Hath Sired Red-Haired Beerzerkers." – 0:58
2. "Surrounded By Skanks" – 3:31
3. "Bodies Adjust" – 3:23
4. "... & The Chocolate Mustache" – 1:59
5. "Pink Motorcycle Helmet (Patrick Dempsey Remix)" – 2:22
6. "Do The Splitz And Say 'Neat!'" – 4:26
