= The Predator Nominate =

EP by Brainiac
- Released: January 20, 2023
- Recorded: 1997
- Genre: Synth-punk; lo-fi
- Length: 14:39
- Label: Touch & Go
- Producer: Brainiac

Brainiac chronology
From Dayton Ohio (2021)	The Predator Nominate (2023)

Brainiac EP chronology
Electro-Shock for President (1997)	The Predator Nominate (2023)

Professional ratings
Review scores
Source	Rating
Allmusic	4/5 stars
Pitchfork	7.5/10

The Predator Nominate is the third extended play by American indie rock band Brainiac, released on January 20, 2023, through Touch & Go Records. It is the band's first release of new music in nearly 26 years, and consists of old demos that were recorded for the band's planned major label debut on Interscope Records, prior to the death of frontman Timmy Taylor in May 1997. Guitarist John Schmersal called The Predator Nominate "Brainiac’s last concerted effort, our last complete thought, before the end.”

The surviving members of Brainiac promoted The Predator Nominate with a brief tour of the United Kingdom as support for Mogwai in February 2023. For the tour, Schmersal replaced Taylor on lead vocals, and guitar duties were handled by Tim Krug.

== Track listing ==
All tracks are written by John Schmersal, Juan Monasterio, Tim Taylor and Tyler Trent, except where noted.

No.	Title	Writer(s)	Length
1.	"Predator Nominate"		1:36
2.	"Kiss of the Dog"	John Schmersal, Juan Monasterio, Tim Taylor	2:40
3.	"Smothered Inside"		2:00
4.	"The Game"		0:46
5.	"Going Wrong"		1:51
6.	"Didn't Feel"		1:25
7.	"Gone Away"		0:31
8.	"Pyramid Theme"		1:58
9.	"Come With Me"		1:47
Total length:			14:39

== Personnel ==
Personnel per liner notes.

Brainiac

- Timmy Taylor – vocals, synthesizers
- John Schmersal – guitar
- Juan Monasterio – bass
- Tyler Trent – drums
