= Doctor, Lawyer, Indian Chief (album) =

Studio album by Thunderbirds Are Now!
- Released: November 26, 2002
- Genres: Noise rock Post-punk revival
- Length: 23:21
- Label: Action Driver

Thunderbirds Are Now! chronology
Another One Hypnotized By... (2003)	Doctor, Lawyer, Indian Chief (2002)	Justamustache (2005)

Professional ratings
Review scores
Source	Rating
AllMusic	4/5 stars
Pitchfork Media	(5.9/10)

Doctor, Lawyer, Indian Chief is an album by Thunderbirds Are Now! The album was released by Action Driver Records on November 26, 2003.

== Track listing ==
1. "Not Witherspoon, But Silverstone"
2. "Pink Motorcycle Helmet"
3. "Keep It on the Lo-Lo"
4. "Kitchen Orgy"
5. "TurboRattt"
6. "Your Mission Is an Intermission"
7. "Party A.R.M."
8. "Who Wants to Fight?"
9. "When It Comes to Elements, Hydrogen Is Titz"
10. "Top Secret Upskirt Camera"
11. "Babygirl, I Got Ten Kids (Let's Not Make It Eleven)"
