= Jack Terricloth =

American musician (1970–2021)

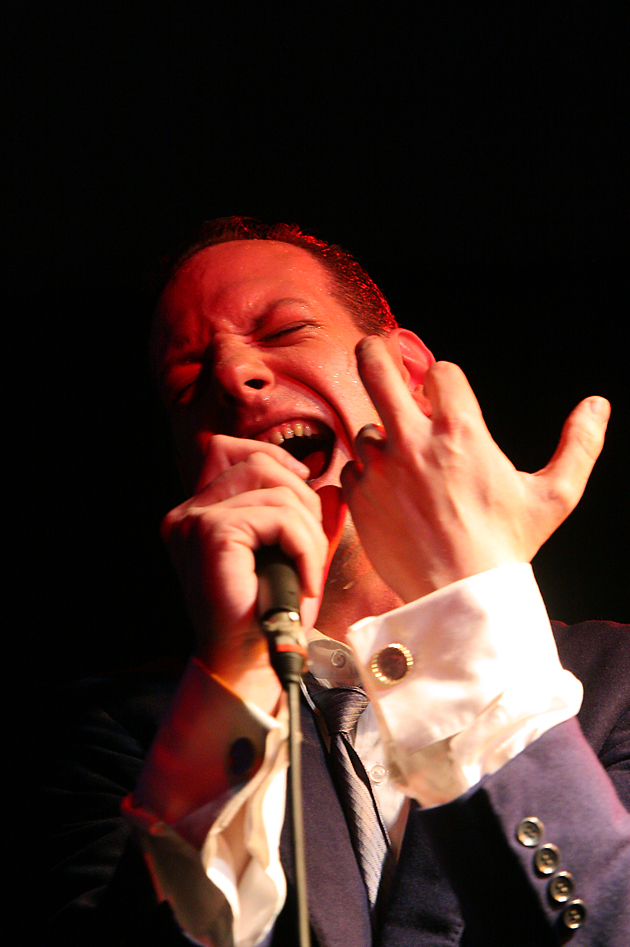
Terricloth performing in 2008

Peter Ventantonio (June 11, 1970 – May 12, 2021), known professionally as Jack Terricloth, was an American musician and guitarist, the lead singer of the cabaret-punk band the World/Inferno Friendship Society and guitarist and vocalist of Sticks and Stones. He died on May 12, 2021, in his Ridgewood, Queens, apartment due to hypertensive cardiovascular disease.

He grew up in Bridgewater Township, New Jersey, the son of a businessman father and a school-principal mother; his hometown is referenced in the 1997 album The True Story of the Bridgewater Astral League by the World/Inferno Friendship Society. He attended Bridgewater-Raritan High School, where he met future Sticks and Stones bassist Osamu Kawahara. During high school, he sold subscriptions to the Courier News. He credited the New Brunswick music scene with putting him on the map, but he moved to Brooklyn.

As the front man and public face of World/Inferno, Terricloth advocated drinking, lying, traveling, stealing, doing drugs, keeping enemies, always looking one's best, getting in fights, befriending hobos and "walking the walk," through his lyrics, on-stage banter, and a rarely updated advice column on the band's website.

He was the author of two chapbooks, Cloth Dam Sorrow and Bakshish, both of which are anthologized with additional material in The Collected Cloth.

His band Sticks and Stones, formed in the late 1980s, reunited in November 2017 for a series of performances in Brooklyn and Asbury Park, New Jersey.

When asked how he would like to be remembered, Terricloth replied: "Just to be remembered would be swell. Maybe remembered as 'that guy who was brave and gave me some ideas.'"

Ventantonio died on May 12, 2021. In 2022 the Jack Terricloth Foundation was founded by his sister Lisa and fellow artist Scott Hollingsworth, with the aim to promote arts and "marginalized voices".
