= Smack Bunny Baby =

Studio album by Brainiac
- Released: July 1993
- Studios: Excello, Brooklyn, New York
- Genres: Post-hardcore; noise rock; alternative rock
- Length: 36:07
- Label: Grass
- Producer: Eli Janney

Brainiac chronology
Smack Bunny Baby (1993)	Bonsai Superstar (1994)

Smack Bunny Baby is the debut album from the band Brainiac, released in 1993 via Grass Records. It is the only album by the group to feature founding guitarist Michelle Bodine. The LP edition of the album includes the track "Velveteen" that was not found on the original CD edition. Some were pressed on turquoise-marbled vinyl.

Along with its successor Bonsai Superstar, as of 2016 Smack Bunny Baby was out-of-print and the copyright was owned by The Bicycle Music Company. However, in December 2023 upon the 30-year anniversary of the original release, the album was reissued on green vinyl (and digital formats) by Craft Recordings, the reissue label of Concord Bicycle Music.

== Critical reception ==
Professional ratings
Review scores
Source	Rating
AllMusic	3.5/5 stars
The Encyclopedia of Popular Music	3/5 stars
Kerrang!	4/5 stars
Mojo	4/5 stars
MusicHound Rock	3/5 stars
NME	8/10

Spin included the album on its 1993 "10 Best Albums of the Year You Didn't Hear" list, calling it "a noisy little devil that benefits greatly from a fondness for Moog synth and a good ear for (buried) melody."

== Track listing ==
No.	Title	Length
1.	"I, Fuzzbot"	3:44
2.	"Ride"	2:47
3.	"Smack Bunny Baby"	2:06
4.	"Martian Dance Invasion"	2:16
5.	"Cultural Zero"	2:57
6.	"Brat Girl"	3:47
7.	"Hurting Me"	4:19
8.	"I Could Own You"	2:58
9.	"Anesthetize"	3:09
10.	"Draag"	4:17
11.	"Get Away"	3:47
Total length:		36:07

LP bonus track
No.	Title	Length
12.	"Velveteen"	3:47
Total length:		39:54

== Personnel ==
- Tim "timmytaylor" Taylor – vocals (tracks 1–3, 5–12), guitars, Moog synthesizer
- Michelle Bodine – guitars, vocals (tracks 4, 8, 10–11)
- Tyler Trent – drums
- Juan "Monostereo" Monasterio – bass
- Eli Janney – production, engineering, recording
- Ray Martin – engineering, mixing assistance
- Bruce Hathaway – engineering, recording assistance
