= Electro-Shock for President =

EP by Brainiac
- Released: April 1, 1997
- Genre: Post-industrial; synth-punk; noise rock
- Length: 14:13
- Label: Touch & Go Records
- Producer: Jim O'Rourke

Brainiac chronology
Hissing Prigs in Static Couture (1996)	Electro-Shock for President (1997)	Attic Tapes (2021)

Brainiac EP chronology
Internationale (1995)	Electro-Shock for President (1997)	The Predator Nominate (2023)

Professional ratings
Review scores
Source	Rating
AllMusic	3/5 stars
MusicHound Rock	4/5 stars

Electro-Shock for President is the second extended play from the band Brainiac. The band decided to primarily use electronic equipment to demonstrate the band's ever-evolving sound. This EP was intended to be a teaser for Brainiac's fourth album, expected to be their major label debut on Interscope Records. However, vocalist and keyboard player Tim Taylor died in a car accident shortly after the EP's release.

Trent Reznor of Nine Inch Nails noted in a BBC radio show (May 2005) that Brainiac was "really inspiring to me from a sonic standpoint." He went on to say that while recording 2005's With Teeth, he would use Electro-Shock for President as a sound reference.

== Track listing ==
No.	Title	Length
1.	"Fresh New Eyes"	2:19
2.	"Flash Ram"	3:34
3.	"Fashion 500"	2:21
4.	"The Turnover"	2:09
5.	"For My Beloved"	0:51
6.	"Mr. Fingers"	2:59

== Personnel ==
Brainiac

- Tim Taylor – vocals, keyboards
- John Schmersal – keyboards, guitars
- Tyler Trent – drums
- Juan Monasterio – bass guitar

Production

- Jim O'Rourke – production, mixing, sound engineer
