= Native Nod =

American emo band

- Origin: Bloomfield, New Jersey
- Genres: Emo, post-hardcore
- Years active: 1990–1994
- Labels: Gern Blandsten, Numero Group
- Past members: Chris Leo; Danny Leo; Dave Lerner; Justin Simon

Native Nod was an American post-hardcore band formed in 1990 and based in the New Jersey/New York metropolitan area. During their short stint as a group, they released a handful of songs, spread across a demo, three EPs, and appearances on compilations between 1990 and 1994. Many of these songs would later be collected and released as Today Puberty, Tomorrow The World in 1995.

== History ==
Chris and Danny Leo met Justin Simon at a skatepark in Bloomfield, New Jersey, and became friends through their shared appreciation of music. Through Simon, they met Dave Lerner. Chris at the time sang in Mental Floss, a role he did not stay in for long.

Native Nod played many of their early shows at ABC No Rio, where they helped grow a scene that detested the often violent hardcore attitudes of CBGB's. They also tended to appear at house shows around the NY/NJ area. It was through these shows that the band would grow in popularity, even before releasing any music.

Throughout their span of time together, the band prided themselves on being different from the tough-guy personality given to hardcore punk at the time and used the term emo as a distinction from those ideas. Through this, the band would embrace humor into their music, like Chris pulling out a trombone mid-song or purposefully wearing "unpunk" outfits.

The band never played a show outside of the tri-state area, except for a show at the Rhode Island School of Design. A tour with Iconoclast was booked, which would've seen the band travel to San Diego, but the band had disagreements on whether to play a specific show, which led to the band pulling from the tour and disbanding. Through fanmail and growing interest in emo from the Midwest, the band played a formal last show at the Center Unitarian Church in Paramus with Current, Angel Hair, and The Yah Mos.

After disbanding, vocalist Chris Leo moved on to form The Van Pelt and later The Lapse, performing as the Vague Angels after The Lapse disbanded. Lerner played drums for Flex Lavender in 1995, then drummed for The Van Pelt for a while, after which he joined Ted Leo and the Pharmacists. He is currently active as a member of Trummors. Drummer Danny Leo went to form Radio to Saturn with Nick Forte from Rorschach, The Sin-Eaters with his (and Chris') brother Ted Leo, and later The Holy Childhood (stylized as "tHE hOLY cHILDHOOD"). Guitarist Justin Simon played in We Acediasts while living in Japan before relocating to New York and establishing Mesh-Key Records.

In 2022, Numero Group announced that they would be reissuing the band's discography, starting with the Answers EP and ending with a new compilation titled This Can't Exist released on September 1, 2023.

== Influences ==
The band's style is often considered as a part of the first wave of emo and post-hardcore. The band's influences came from the member's eclectic taste in music, from punk bands like Black Flag and Sonic Youth to hip hop like De La Soul and A Tribe Called Quest. Chris Leo has specifically cited Kim Gordon and Rakim as influences of his singing style. The band also cited Mudhoney as a big influence on them.

== Members ==
- Chris Leo – vocals
- Danny Leo – drums
- Dave Lerner – bass
- Justin Simon – guitar

== Discography ==
=== EPs ===
- Self-titled demo (1991)
- Answers (1992, Gern Blandsten)
- Bread (1993, Gern Blandsten)
- New Compositions and Arrangements for the Zither (1995, Gern Blandsten)

=== Compilations ===
- Today Puberty, Tomorrow The World (1995, Gern Blandsten)
- This Can't Exist (2023, Numero Group)

=== Appearances on compilations ===
- "Mr. President" on Fear Of Smell (1992, Vermiform)
- "Back To Mimsey" on God's Chosen People (1993, Old Glory Records)
- "Answers" on Gern Blandsten - The First Nine Years (2001, Gern Blandsten)
