= Lost Marbles and Exploded Evidence =

Compilation album by Enon
- Released: February 22, 2005
- Studio: Crush Proof studio, Notausgang
- Genre: Post-punk: noise pop; synth-pop
- Label: Touch and Go
- Producer: Dave Sardy

Enon chronology
Hocus Pocus (2003)	Lost Marbles and Exploded Evidence (2005)	Grass Geysers...Carbon Clouds (2007)

Singles from Lost Marbles and Exploded Evidence
- 1. "Fly South / The List Of Short Demands" Released: January 1998; 2. "Marbles Explode / Raisin Heart" Released: March 2001; 3. "The Nightmare Of Atomic Men" Released: June 2, 2001; 4. "Normal Is Happening" Released: February 2002; 5. "Drowning Appointments / Perfect Draft" Released: May 2002

Professional ratings
Review scores
Source	Rating
AllMusic	4/5 stars
Pitchfork	7.7/10
PopMatters	6/10
Drowned in Sound	8/10

Lost Marbles and Exploded Evidence is a collection of B-sides and rarities from the band Enon. It was released on February 22, 2005.

== Track listing ==
1. "Knock that Door"
2. "The Nightmare of Atomic Men"
3. "Adalania (Not So Fair)"
4. "Drowning Appointments"
5. "Normal Is Happening"
6. "Grain of Assault"
7. "Genie's Got Her Bag"
8. "Kanon"
9. "Blow Infinite Ways"
10. "Tilt You Up!"
11. "Marbles Explode"
12. "Raisin Heart"
13. "Evidence"
14. "Fly South"
15. "Making Merry! Merry!"
16. "Party Favor"
