= Hocus Pocus (Enon album) =

Studio album by Enon
- Released: September 9, 2003
- Genre: Indie rock, art pop
- Length: 38:26
- Label: Touch & Go

Enon chronology
High Society (2002)	Hocus Pocus (2003)	Lost Marbles and Exploded Evidence (2005)

Singles from Hocus Pocus
- 1. "Starcastic" Released: August 27, 2003

Professional ratings
Review scores
Source	Rating
AllMusic	3.5/5 stars
Pitchfork	7.0/10
Drowned in Sound	7/10
PopMatters	Favorable

Hocus Pocus is an album by Enon, released on September 9, 2003, by Touch and Go Records.

The album contains a URL to a hidden website that can be seen by removing the black disc holder in the jewel case.

== Track listing ==
1. "Shave" – 2:46
2. "The Power of Yawning" – 3:44
3. "Murder Sounds" – 3:53
4. "Storm the Gates" – 3:50
5. "Daughter in the House of Fools" – 2:52
6. "Mikazuki" – 2:48
7. "Candy" – 2:46
8. "Monsoon" – 2:56
9. "Utz" – 2:21
10. "Spanish Boots" – 3:14
11. "Starcastic" – 2:54
12. "Litter in the Glitter" – 1:40
13. "Hocus Pocus" – 2:35
