= Gutbucket (band) =

American jazz fusion band

- Origin: Brooklyn, New York
- Genres: Punk jazz, jazz fusion, avant-garde jazz, progressive rock
- Years active: 1999–present
- Labels: Cuneiform
- Members: Ty Citerman; Adam Gold; Pat Swoboda; Ken Thomson
- Website: gutweb.com

Gutbucket is an American jazz fusion band from Brooklyn, New York, formed in 1999. Comprising Ty Citerman on guitar, Adam Gold on drums, Pat Swoboda on bass guitar, and Ken Thomson on saxophone, the band is known for its chaotic, unpredictable performances and use of elements from multiple genres of music.

== History ==
Gutbucket was formed in Brooklyn, New York City in 1999.

The band's work has received generally favorable reviews from the music press over the years. Writing for Allmusic, David R. Adler gave their debut album, InsomniacsDream, four stars out of five and called it "a promising debut from a band with a strong sense of purpose and an abundance of live energy." Chris Nixon of Allmusic also gave their fourth album, A Modest Proposal, four stars; he compared it to King Crimson, Soft Machine, Albert Ayler, and Eugene Chadbourne and called it "a superb record." Allmusic's Thom Jurek also gave their fifth album, Flock, four stars, naming it "their most provocative album—which is saying plenty—but ... also their most antagonistically accessible." Jazz publication The Jazz Mann's Tim Owen gave Flock three and a half stars out of five.

== Musical style ==
Gutbucket's musical style is a fusion of jazz and various rock forms. It has been described as, among other genres, punk jazz, avant-garde jazz, progressive rock, and heavy metal, and certain songs have leaned into the likes of sludge metal, post-rock, punk rock, funk, Latin music, and klezmer. Reviewing a recent performance for the Los Angeles Times, Chris Barton categorized Gutbucket's sound as "a jagged yet fertile seam between jazz and rock highlighted by on-a-dime twists in tempo, time signatures and mood—often within the same song."

== Discography ==
- InsomniacsDream (2001)
- Dry Humping the American Dream (2004)
- Sludge Test (2006)
- A Modest Proposal (2009)
- Flock (2011)
- Dance (2016)
