= Bonsai Superstar =

Studio album by Brainiac
- Released: November 21, 1994
- Studio: Plantain, Brooklyn, New York City
- Genre: Noise rock; post-hardcore; art pop; avant-rock; dance-punk; indie rock
- Length: 33:44
- Label: Grass
- Producer: Eli Janney

Brainiac chronology
Smack Bunny Baby (1993)	Bonsai Superstar (1994)	Internationale (1995)

Bonsai Superstar is the second album from the band Brainiac, released on November 21, 1994. It is the first album on which guitarist John Schmersal appears, who remained as the band's lead guitarist until their break-up in 1997.

Originally released through Grass Records on LP and CD formats, the album was long out-of-print. The album's copyright was transferred to The Bicycle Music Company after Grass Records merged with Wind-Up Records and subsequently sold the copyrights to the band's music. Bonsai Superstar has subsequently been reissued as a download via Spotify, Tidal, Amazon and other streaming platforms.

== Background and recording ==
The album was recorded in Brooklyn, New York, with engineering and production duties done by Girls Against Boys bassist Eli Janney. The album was edited at Ward Joe, New York City and was mixed in Brooklyn. Larry Nicki mastered the album in Ardent, Memphis, Tennessee. The track "Meathook Manicure" was specifically recorded in the basement of one of the band member's house. To record the vocals, a cheap bullet microphone was used, which experienced a short out during the recording, resulting in some added feedback noise in the final recording.

The track "You Wrecked My Hair" was the first song by the group to feature contributions by Schmersal. The voice samples on "Fucking with the Altimiter" was taken from a record Taylor found at a store Knoxville, Tennessee. The vocals for the chorus on "Fucking With the Altimiter" were performed in front of a fan, giving them a type of stutter effect.

== Reception ==
Professional ratings
Review scores
Source	Rating
AllMusic	4/5 stars
Dayton Daily News	3.5/4 stars
The Encyclopedia of Popular Music	3/5 stars
Kerrang!	4/5 stars
MusicHound Rock	4/5 stars
NME	8/10
Trouser Press	(favourable)

While the album received little critical attention since its initial release in 1994, the attention it did end up receiving was very positive. Bonsai Superstar is considered as one of the best recordings by the band. Brian Egan, for AllMusic, stated that the album "captures a band that was ahead of their time and still moving forward". Tim Krug (of Oh Condor) referred to the recording as his favorite album of all time; he would later join Brainiac for a series of reunion shows in 2023. Pitchfork Media ranked the album No. 57 in their Top 100 albums of the 1990s feature.

== Track listing ==
No.	Title	Length
1.	"Hot Metal Doberman's"	2:47
2.	"Hands of the Genius"	2:24
3.	"Fucking with the Altimiter"	2:24
4.	"Radio Apeshot"	3:22
5.	"Transmissions After Zero"	1:36
6.	"Juicy (On a Cadillac)"	2:27
7.	"Flypaper"	2:36
8.	"Sexual Frustration"	3:13
9.	"To the Baby-Counter"	2:24
10.	"You Wrecked My Hair"	3:17
11.	"Meathook Manicure"	1:37
12.	"Status: Choke"	3:13
13.	"Collide"	2:20
Total length:		33:44

== Personnel ==
Brainiac

- Tim Taylor (credited as timmytaylor) - vocals
- John Schmersal (credited as Little Greenie) - guitar
- Juan Monasterio (credited as Monostereo and B Chango) - bass
- Tyler Trent (credited as Claire Quilty) - drums

Production

- Eli Janney - production, engineering, navigation
- Larry Nicki - mastering
- The Puddles - photography
