= Internationale (EP) =

EP by Brainiac
- Released: October 10, 1995
- Length: 10:05
- Label: Touch and Go
- Producer: Kim Deal

Brainiac chronology
| Bonsai Superstar (1994) | Internationale (1995) | Hissing Prigs in Static Couture (1996) |

Brainiac EP chronology
| Internationale (1995) | Electro-Shock for President (1997) |

Professional ratings
Review scores
| Source | Rating |
|---|---|
| AllMusic | 3/5 stars |
| MusicHound Rock | 2/5 stars |

Internationale is the first extended play by American indie rock band Brainiac, released on October 10, 1995. Produced by Kim Deal, it was their first release on Touch and Go Records.

== Track listing ==
1. "Go Freaks Go" – 2:24
2. "Silver Iodine" – 2:59
3. "Simon Says" – 5:22
