= Grass Geysers...Carbon Clouds =

Studio album by Enon
- Released: October 9, 2007
- Genre: Noise rock, art pop, post-punk
- Label: Touch and Go

Enon chronology
Lost Marbles and Exploded Evidence (2005)	Grass Geysers...Carbon Clouds (2007)

Singles from Grass Geysers...Carbon Clouds
- 1. "Mr. Ratatatatat" Released: October 10, 2007; 2. "Mirror On You" Released: March 2008

Professional ratings
Review scores
Source	Rating
AllMusic	3/5 stars
The A.V. Club	A
Pitchfork	(7.4/10)

Grass Geysers...Carbon Clouds is the fourth and final studio album from indie rock band Enon, released in 2007 via Touch and Go Records.

== Track listing ==
1. "Mirror On You"
2. "Colette"
3. "Dr. Freeze"
4. "Sabina"
5. "Peace of Mind"
6. "Law of Johnny Dolittle"
7. "Those Who Don't Blink"
8. "Pigeneration"
9. "Mr. Ratatatatat"
10. "Paperweights"
11. "Labyrinth"
12. "Ashish"
