= The Lapse =

American indie rock band

- Genres: Indie rock
- Years active: 1997–2001
- Labels: Gern Blandsten, Southern
- Spinoff of: The Van Pelt
- Past members: Chris Leo; Toko Yasuda

The Lapse was an American indie band formed in late 1997.

== History ==
The band was first signed to Gern Blandsten, then Southern Records. A larger deal with Matador Records fell through in 2001. The Lapse was the duo of then boyfriend/girlfriend Chris Leo (ex-Native Nod and brother of Ted Leo) and Toko Yasuda (Enon, ex-Blonde Redhead). They formed The Lapse after the breakup of their previous band, The Van Pelt. The Lapse had Leo on guitar and Yasuda on bass with both handling vocals. The band welcomed a long list of guest musicians over the years, including Don Devore, Justin DuClos, and Gary Keating.

The group's debut album, Betrayal!, was partially made up of songs Leo originally written for The Van Pelt. The follow-up, 2000's Heaven Ain't Happenin', deviated mainly from indie rock and was focused towards more of an experimental sound.

The Lapse formally disbanded in 2001, with Yasuda leaving to join Enon. Leo went to form the Vague Angels, with Chris as primary singer/songwriter on guitar.

== Discography ==
- Betrayal! (1998, Gern Blandsten)
- Heaven Ain't Happenin' (2000, Southern Records)
