= Drowaton =

Studio album by Starlight Mints
- Released: April 25, 2006
- Genre: Indie pop
- Length: 40:18

Professional ratings
Review scores
Source	Rating
Allmusic	3.5/5 stars
Pitchfork Media	(7.1/10)

Drowaton is the third studio album by the indie pop band Starlight Mints.

== Track listing ==
All tracks by Starlight Mints

1. "Pumpkin" – 2:40
2. "Torts" – 2:03
3. "Inside of Me" – 3:43
4. "Pearls (Submarine #2)" – 2:14
5. "Seventeen Devils" – 3:49
6. "Rhino Stomp" – 3:24
7. "The Killer" – 3:02
8. "Eyes of the Night" – 2:51
9. "Drowaton" – 5:01
10. "The Bee" – 3:27
11. "Rosemarie" – 3:29
12. "Sidewalk" – 4:24
