= The Van Pelt =

American indie rock band

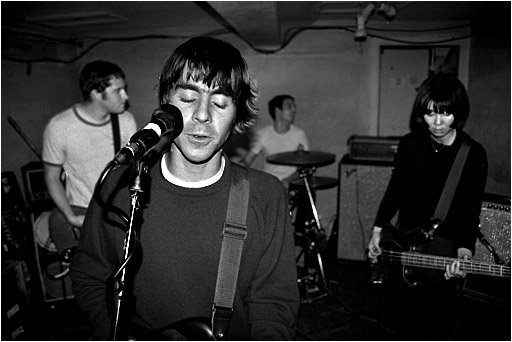
- The Van Pelt performing in 1997 in Glasgow; left to right: Maryansky, Leo, O'Brien, Yasuda

Background information
- Origin: New York City, United States
- Genres: Indie rock, emo, post-hardcore
- Years active: 1993–1997, 2009, 2014, 2017–present
- Labels: Sudden Shame, Whirled, Gern Blandsten, Air King Alliance, Red Cars Go Faster, La Castanya, Gringo, Spartan
- Members: Chris Leo (1993–1997, 2017–present); Brian Maryansky (1993–1997, 2017–present); Neil O'Brien (1993–1997, 2017–present); Sean Greene (1996–1997, 2017–present)
- Past members: Barry London (1993–1995); Toko Yasuda (1993–1996)
- Website: Gern Blandsten profile

The Van Pelt is an American indie rock band from New York City that were active from 1993 to 1997, and have reformed several times since.

== History ==
=== 1993–1997: Formation, Thieves, Sultans, and disbandment ===
The band originally formed in 1993 at New York University, with Chris Leo (formerly of Native Nod and brother of Ted Leo) on vocals and guitar, David Baum on guitar, Barry London on bass, and Neil O'Brien on drums. Their musical influences included Television, Lungfish, Superchunk, Seam, Codeine, and Slint.

A seven-song demo was recorded with Geoff Turner at WGNS studio in DC, and a split single with Radio to Saturn featuring "His Saxophone Is My Guitar" was released on Sudden Shame Records. London soon left the group, and Toko Yasuda joined the band in 1995 to record their first album Stealing From Our Favorite Thieves in 1996 with Alap Momin at Sweetwood Sound. Baum and Yasuda left the group within the year, Yasuda joining Blonde Redhead. Brian Maryansky and Sean Greene joined in late 1996 for the writing and recording of Sultans Of Sentiment in 1997. Both albums were released by Gern Blandsten Records. Greene soon left the band and Toko Yasuda returned to tour and record the Speeding Train EP, which was released by Art Monk Construction Records.

The Van Pelt disbanded in 1997, with Leo and Yasuda forming a new band called The Lapse that year. Maryansky joined Jets to Brazil in 1998.

=== 2009–present: Reunions, Imaginary Third, and Artisans ===
The band reunited in 2009 for two shows, playing one show on June 20 at the Blackcat in Washington, D.C., with Frodus, and another on June 21 at Kung Fu Necktie in Philadelphia, Pennsylvania.

In February 2014, it was announced that the band would be issuing a record of previous unreleased material recorded around 1996 and 1997, as well as reforming to play at the All Tomorrow's Parties Jabberwocky festival in London. The album, Imaginary Third, was released in April 2014.

On December 6, 2022, the band announced via Instagram that a fourth studio album, entitled Artisans & Merchants, would be released the next year. This album marked the first new recordings by the band since the 90s. The record was released by Spartan Records in North America, Gringo Records in the UK, and La Castanya in Europe and the rest of the world. The first single from the album, "Punk House", was released on January 20, 2023, alongside worldwide pre-orders for the album. A second and third single, "Image of Health" and "Grid", were released prior to the album's release on March 17, 2023.

== Discography ==
=== Albums ===
- Stealing From Our Favorite Thieves (1996, Gern Blandsten)
- Sultans Of Sentiment (1997, Gern Blandsten)
- Imaginary Third (2014, La Castanya)
- Tramonto - Live in Ferrara 12.08.2014 (2016, Gringo Records / Flying Kid)
- Artisans & Merchants (2023, Spartan Records / Gringo Records / La Castanya)
- Remain Obscure (2026, Wrong Speed Records / Ernest Jenning)

=== EPs ===
- The Van Pelt (1997, Art Monk Construction)

=== Singles ===
- Split with Radio To Saturn (1994, Sudden Shame)
- Split with (Young) Pioneers (1995, Whirled)
- Split with Chisel (1997, Air King Alliance)
- Same As Stone 7" (2005, recorded in 1993, Red Cars Go Faster)
- "Punk House" (2023)
- "Image of Health" (2023)
- "Grid" (2023)
