= See Thru Broadcasting =

See Thru Broadcasting is a record label that was the brainchild of record producer D. Sardy. For two years, new bands were jettisoned onto the college music charts and into Mom and Pop record stores. The web site was central to See Thru's identity, which Zurkow art directed. All album art and ancillary packaging was designed by Nancy Nowacek and Zurkow.

== Bands ==
- Enon
- Gwen Mars
- Mike G
- Starlight Mints

== See also ==
- List of record labels
