= Enon (band) =

American rock band

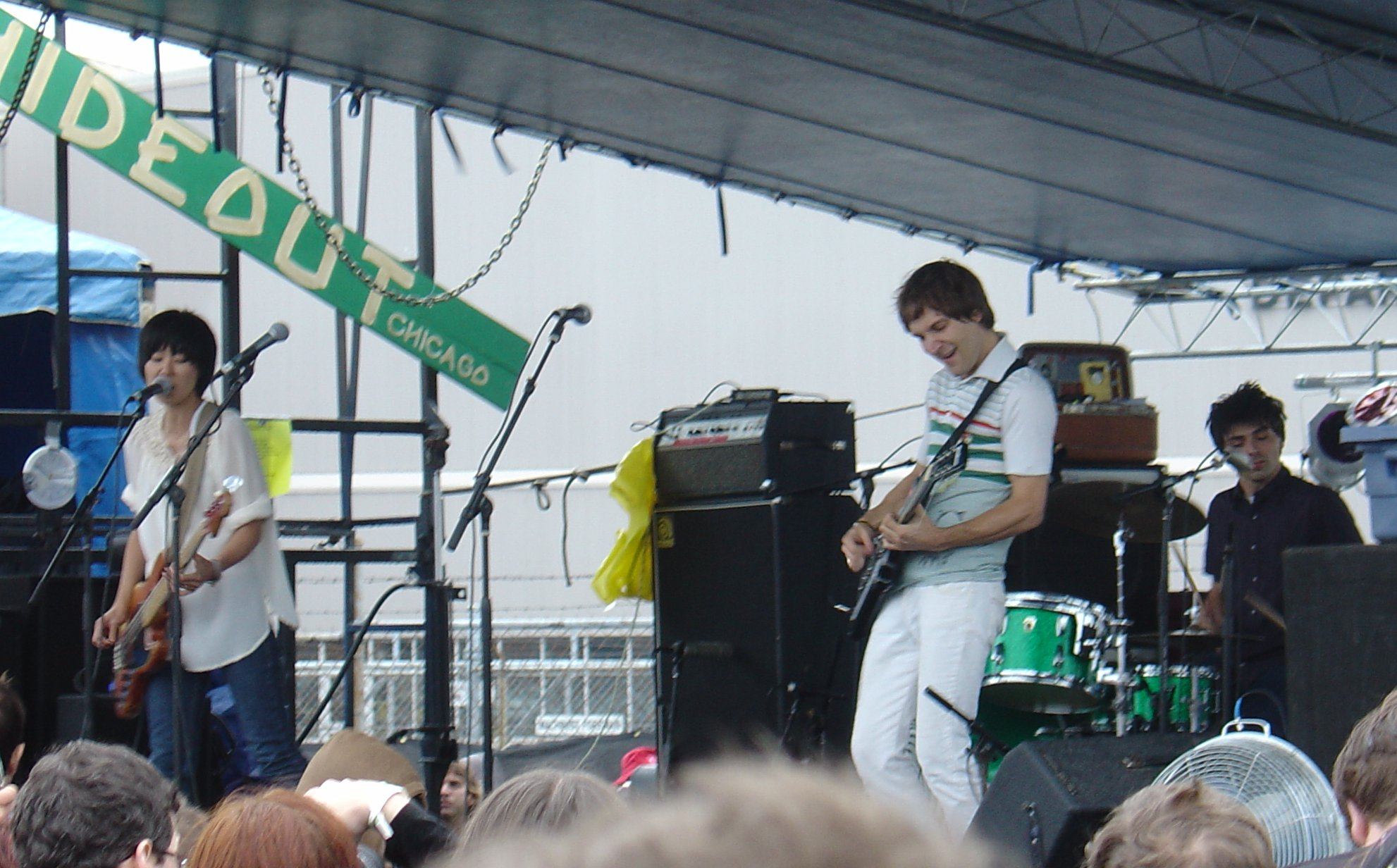
- Enon live at the Hideout Block Party in Chicago, 2006

Background information
- Origin: New York
- Genres: Indie rock, art pop, indietronica, dance-punk, noise rock
- Years active: 1997–2011
- Labels: Touch and Go
- Spinoffs: Crooks On Tape
- Spinoff of: Brainiac
- Past members: John Schmersal; Toko Yasuda; Rick Lee; Steve Calhoon; Matt Schulz
- Website: www.enon.tv

Enon was an indie rock band founded by John Schmersal, Rick Lee, and Steve Calhoon that was active from 1997 to 2011; for most of its history, however, Enon was a three-piece outfit composed of Schmersal, Toko Yasuda, and Matt Schulz. Though situated for a time in Philadelphia, Enon was primarily known for being part of the New York music scene.

Enon was known for using Moog synthesizers and Teisco guitars. Schmersal's green guitar he often used on stage was a Teisco TG-64, and he also owns a Teisco Del Rey. Yasuda played a Fender Jazz Bass with an adapted tuning machine, which allowed quickly tuning to D from E. Schmersal also owns a custom built Twister guitar built by Yuri Landman, an alternate version of the Springtime exclusively crafted for Enon with some additional features such as a scalloped fretboard and an additional pickup in the bridge.

Enon released 4 studio albums, 2 instrumental albums, a compilation, 17 singles and multiple free song downloads throughout the band's lifespan. After breaking up in 2011, Yasuda went on to start her own solo project; Plvs Vltra, Schulz went on to play in Holy Fuck, and Schmersal reunited with Brainiac to perform live and released cancelled material after nearly 20 years of inactivity.

== History ==
=== 1997–2001: Formation, Long Play, Believo! ===
Schmersal was originally in the band Brainiac and formed Enon (named after the village in Ohio, which is close to Schmersal's hometown of Dayton) with Lee and Calhoon following the death of Brainiac's singer Timmy Taylor and their subsequent disbandment. After Brainiac, Schmersal made a solo album under the name John Stuart Mill. Rick Lee and Steve Calhoon were both previous members of the band Skeleton Key, a befriended band Brainiac had toured with. Together they formed Enon. Lee created a number of percussion sounds for the band playing a "junk kit" including a Radio Flyer wagon, propane tank, and old hubcaps. Enon released a short instrumental album named "Long Play" in 1998, some of the songs from the album were later adapted for their future studio work.

After the release of their first studio album Believo!, which was Produced by D. Sardy and signed to his SeeThru Broadcasting label in 1999, Calhoon left the band and was replaced by Toko Yasuda (bass/vocals/keyboard) and Matt Schulz (drums). Yasuda was previously in the bands Blonde Redhead, The Lapse and The Van Pelt. In 2000, Schmersal performed the theme song for Funny Garbage's “Katbot” interactive website, with small contributions from other Enon members.

=== 2002–2005: High Society, Songs of the Month, Hocus Pocus, Lost Marbles ===
SeeThru Broadcasting was initially set to release Enon's upcoming studio album in September 2001, but the label decided to close following the 9/11 attacks in New York. Enon temporarily released their second instrumental album "On Hold" in 2001 to compensate fans for waiting. Enon signed with the Chicago-based indie label, Touch and Go Records after the closing of SeeThru Broadcasting, with a new lineup, label, and sound; Enon released their second studio album High Society in 2002, after around half a year of limbo, and toured with The Faint. High Society was generally praised by critics for its showcase of the band's evolving sound, and the addition of Yasuda as a lead singer on most of the album. Enon also released a self titled EP earlier in the year, containing 7 tracks; most of which were featured on their future compilation, Lost Marbles and Exploded Evidence.

From April 2002 to December 2003, Enon released a free unreleased song once a month on their official website. All songs were made available as 128 kbit/s MP3 downloads and only available during the month they were released. Shortly after the release of High Society, Lee left the band, and Enon went on to release Hocus Pocus in 2003. Hocus Pocus received mixed reviews from critics, partially due to its heavy experimentation and disorienting tracklist; although praise was given to Schmersal and Yasuda's vocal and writing collaboration on tracks like "Murder Sounds", and "Starcastic". Enon released a collection of singles and previously difficult to find internet-released songs with a bonus DVD entitled Lost Marbles and Exploded Evidence in February 2005, the collection was generally liked by critics. Also in 2005, Schmersal relocated to Philadelphia and opened his own recording studio. Mean Reds, Thunderbirds Are Now! and other bands recorded albums with Schmersal in this period. Schmersal re-recorded the "Katbot" theme song, after the show had been picked up by Disney in late 2005; the song went unused however, as the show went unaired and was eventually quietly cancelled after 4 episodes were produced.

=== 2006–2011: Commercial work, Grass Geysers, Collaborations, and Breakup ===
After opening his studio, and working with Disney on Katbot in 2005, Schemersal's music was used for series opens, promo packages and channel branding for Sundance Channel, as well as scoring work for the animated feature Monster House (with composer David Sardy) and the award-winning 2007 indie film Tie a Yellow Ribbon. While performing with Enon, Schmersal (sometimes accompanied by Yasuda) found himself in demand as a composer for short films, animated programs, bumpers and interstitials, and commercials for clients including Disney, Cartoon Network, MTV and Nickelodeon. Many of these instrumentals feature the signature electro-analog quirkiness emblematic of Enon.

In 2007, all three members of Enon contributed to Les Savy Fav's album Let's Stay Friends. Yasuda also did vocal contributions to previous recordings of this band, e.g. the first track of The Cat and the Cobra. Later in the year, Enon released their fourth and final studio album, Grass Geysers...Carbon Clouds on Touch and Go Records on October 9, 2007. to generally positive reviews, higher than their previous album; Hocus Pocus. Although the album leaked early on September 5, sales were still high on digitally storefronts like iTunes, with an exclusive song being offered to boost sales on the platform. To accompany the release of Grass Geysers, Believo! received a reissue by Touch and Go the same day, which contained all of its music videos.

In summer 2008, drummer Matt Schulz announced that he would be leaving the group to pursue other interests. Afterwards he joined Holy Fuck as a touring member. Brainiac's former bassist, Monasterio, released an album in 2008 with a new band called Model/Actress; with Schmersal making appearances on the album. An otherwise unreleased song called "We Are The Robots" was used in the October 2008 episode of cult children's TV series Yo Gabba Gabba! titled "Robot." The 1:21 song was accompanied by animation of robots playing with children and assisting with household chores. In 2009, Schmersal and Yasuda recorded the opening theme for PBS Kids show Dash's Dance Party.

In a May 2011 interview, after touring with Caribou for a good portion of 2010 and 2011, Schmersal confirmed the band "is pretty much over" with no plans to follow up on Grass Geysers...Carbon Clouds. From 2011 to 2014 Yasuda toured with St. Vincent playing synth.

== Side projects ==
=== John Stuart Mill ===
Prior to the recording and release of Believo!, Schmersal recorded and released a solo album under the name John Stuart Mill, after the British philosopher and political economist. Schemeral released one 13-track album, "Forget Everything," as John Stuart Mill on See-Thru Broadcasting in 1999. The album was released on CD only and quickly went out of print when the label folded. Columbus-based Scioto Records reissued "Forget Everything" on Bandcamp and on vinyl in 2016.

=== Crooks On Tape ===
In 2010 Schmersal reteamed with Enon's Rick Lee and drummer Joey Galvan to create the improvisational trio Crooks On Tape. The band released the album "Fingerprint" on Misra Records in 2013 and an instrumental, vinyl-only album "In The Realm Of The Ancient Minor" on Pure Orgone for Record Store Day 2015.

=== Plvs Vltra ===
Since 2012 Yasuda has recorded under the name Plvs Vltra, releasing the solo album Parthenon on Spectrum Spools in 2012. Schmersal produced that album, which also features appearances from Danny Ray Thompson of the Sun Ra Arkestra, Scott Allen of Thunderbirds Are Now, Thomas Keville of Man Man.

In 2013 Plvs Vltra released the non-LP single "Rooftop Arcade" b/w "Mesopotamia" on Columbus-based Scioto Records. That same year, Plvs Vltra released second album Yo-Yo Blue on Bandcamp and on the cassette-only label Field Hymns.

=== Vertical Scratchers ===
In 2014 Schmersal collaborated with drummer Christian Eric Beaulieu (Triclops!, Anywhere, Peace Creeps) to form Vertical Scratchers. The band released the album Daughter of Everything on Merge Records in 2014 which featured guest appearances by Jonathan Hischke (Flying Luttenbachers, Hella, Broken Bells) and fellow Daytonite Robert Pollard (Guided By Voices). Pitchfork gave the album a 7.2 rating, calling the music "rock‘n’roll rendered on Etch A Sketch...occasionally, you find yourself marveling at an accidental masterpiece."

Vertical Scratchers also contributed an exclusive track, "Jackie's Favorite," to the Merge 7-inch box set Or Thousands Of Prizes.

== Members ==
=== Final lineup ===
- John Schmersal – vocals, guitars, synthesizers
- Toko Yasuda – bass, vocals, synthesizers

=== Former members ===
- Rick Lee – synthesizers, samples, guitar, bass
- Steve Calhoon – drums, percussion
- Matt Schulz – drums, percussion

== Discography ==
Studio albums

- Believo! (2000)
- High Society (2002)
- Hocus Pocus (2003)
- Grass Geysers...Carbon Clouds (2007)

== Videography ==
- "Come Into" (2001, directed by Paul Cordes Wilm)
- "Cruel" (2001, directed by Paul Cordes Wilm)
- "Window Display" (2002, directed by Brian Quain, not an official video)
- "Carbonation" (July 2002, directed by Paul Cordes Wilm)
- "Pleasure and Privilege" (October 2002, directed by Clark Vogeler)
- "In This City" (February 2003, directed by Josh Graham, Juan Monasterio, and Arya Senboutaraj)
- "Murder Sounds" (2004, directed by Paul Cordes Wilm)
- "Daughter in the House of Fools" (2004, directed by Rainbows & Vampires)
- "Mikazuki" (2004, directed by The Wilderness)

== See also ==
- Brainiac
- Crooks On Tape
- Plvs Vltra
- Vertical Scratchers
- Blonde Redhead
- Deerhoof
- Les Savy Fav
- The Lapse
- The Van Pelt
- David Sardy
