= Thunderbirds Are Now! =

American post-punk revival band

- Origin: Livonia, Michigan
- Genres: Post-punk revival, noise rock, new wave, indie rock
- Years active: 2002–2009, 2013, 2017
- Labels: Action Driver Records; French Kiss Records
- Members: Ryan Allen; Scott Allen; Matt Rickle; Julian Wettlin
- Past members: Howard Chang; Mike Durgan; Marty Smith

Thunderbirds are Now! were an American, Livonia, Michigan-based post-punk revival band, whose sound used a mix of traditional post-punk, new wave and noise rock. The band was heavily influenced by 1980s new wave and other post-punk revival acts like Les Savy Fav. They were signed to French Kiss Records, with an additional two releases on Action Driver Records and an EP on Acutest Records.

The band's name is based on the popular British television program Thunderbirds, known for its use of marionettes.

They became inactive in 2009, but reunited for a one-off show in Detroit in 2013.

In 2017, they reunited once again and released two new songs.

== Other projects ==
During and since Thunderbirds Are Now!, Ryan Allen has been involved in numerous projects, including Friendly Foes (2008-2010), Ryan Allen & His Extra Arms (2011–present), and Destroy This Place (2013–present). Before Thunderbirds Are Now!, he was a drummer in Red Shirt Brigade.

Scott Allen plays in Livonia-based band Big Mess (2011–Present), while Matt Rickle and Julian Wettlin continue to be active in Detroit-based Javelins (2004–present).

== Discography ==
=== Albums ===
- Doctor, Lawyer, Indian Chief (2003)
- Justamustache (2005)
- Make History (2006)

=== EPs ===
- Thunderbirds Are Now! (2002)
- Another One Hypnotized By... (2003)
- Necks EP (2005)
- Outsiders / Operate (2017)

=== Singles ===
- "Eat This City" (2005)
- "From Skulls" (2005)
- "We Win (Ha Ha)" (2006)
