= Brainiac (band) =

American indie rock band

- Also known as: 3RA1N1AC
- Origin: Dayton, Ohio, United States
- Genres: Indie rock; noise rock; post-hardcore; synthpunk; experimental rock; alternative rock; art pop; math rock; post-industrial; electronic
- Years active: 1992–1997; 2019; 2022–present
- Labels: 12X12; Limited Potential; Grass; Touch and Go
- Spinoffs: Enon
- Members: John Schmersal; Juan Monasterio; Tyler Trent
- Past members: Timmy Taylor; Michelle Bodine
- Website: 3ra1n1ac.com

Brainiac (also stylized as 3RA1N1AC), is an American indie rock band from Dayton, Ohio. It was formed in January 1992 by Tim Taylor, Juan Monasterio (Monostereo), Michelle Bodine and Tyler Trent. They disbanded after the sudden death of lead singer Tim Taylor in a car accident on May 23, 1997.

== History ==
=== Formation and early albums (1992–1997) ===
Brainiac was formed in January 1992 in Dayton, Ohio, by vocalist, keyboardist, and guitarist Tim Taylor (July 20, 1968 – May 23, 1997), bassist Juan Monasterio (Monostereo), guitarist Michelle Bodine and drummer Tyler Trent. On March 12, the band played its first show opening for the Oxymorons at Wright State University's Rathskellar, under the name We'll Eat Anything.

After a slew of singles, they released their debut album, Smack Bunny Baby, on Grass Records in 1993. Shortly after the album's release, Gary Gersh offered Brainiac a £2 million record deal with Geffen Records; allegedly, the band's response was to tell him to "fuck off." In November 1993, Bodine left the band, and was replaced by John Schmersal. The band's next album, Bonsai Superstar, was released in 1994. In 1995 they played on the Lollapalooza side stage and recorded four songs in the UK for the BBC Radio 1 Peel Sessions. They then signed to Touch and Go Records and released the EP Internationale, produced by Kim Deal. The following year, their third album, Hissing Prigs in Static Couture, was released on Touch and Go. All three of their studio albums were produced by Eli Janney of Girls Against Boys.

=== Electronic influence and Taylor's death (1997) ===
Brainiac generated buzz as a live act to see that resulted in opening slots on tours for Beck, the Breeders, and the Jesus Lizard, and received offers from major labels. The most prominent bids came from Elektra Records and Interscope Records, and the band was poised to sign with the latter. In 1997, they released the EP Electro-Shock for President, produced by Jim O'Rourke, which was intended to be a teaser for their fourth album.

On May 23, 1997, while driving back home, Taylor lost control of his 1972 Mercedes and crashed into a lamppost, which burst into flames. He was 28 years old. According to Schmersal, a post-mortem toxicology report indicated that Taylor had died of carbon monoxide poisoning before his vehicle crashed; in the documentary Transmissions After Zero, Trent and Schmersal recount that Taylor had bought the car five days earlier, and that the back of the car was so rusted out that exhaust was leaking into the passenger compartment. The group soon disbanded. A benefit show featuring Dayton bands Guided By Voices and the Breeders took place a few months later.

=== After Taylor's death (1997–present) ===
After recording a solo album as John Stuart Mill, Schmersal later went on to form Enon. Monasterio directs music videos, including two for Enon, and released in 2008 an EP with a new band called Model/Actress with Curtis Mead and Charlie Walker from Chamberlain and ex-Bullet LaVolta drummer Philips; Schmersal makes appearances on this album. Trent briefly joined the Breeders and most recently played with the Dirty Walk. Bodine became the guitarist and singer of O-matic and Shesus.

In early 2019, a documentary entitled Transmissions After Zero was released by director Eric Mahoney to favorable reviews. This included several live performances at various locations, with friend Tim Krug including New York, Los Angeles and their hometown of Dayton, Ohio. The film was released on DVD and streaming on February 21, 2020.

The surviving members of Brainiac also appeared on an episode of Conan Neutron's Protonic Reversal to discuss the career of the band, the death of Tim Taylor and the documentary.

In 2022, the band was announced as UK tour support for Mogwai for February 2023. These dates were followed by a headlining tour in the UK, again in February 2023. In January the band released The Predator Nominate EP featuring never-before-heard demos.

== Influence and legacy ==
During a BBC radio session, Nine Inch Nails' frontman Trent Reznor commented on Brainiac that they were a major influence on him, "from a sonic standpoint." He also revealed that while recording 2005's With Teeth he would use Electro-Shock for President as a "sound reference."

Chris Walla of Death Cab for Cutie claimed Brainiac influenced his work on Narrow Stairs.

Matt Bellamy of Muse claims that a certain section in the song "Exo-Politics" from Black Holes and Revelations was heavily influenced by Brainiac.

Cedric Bixler-Zavala and Omar Rodríguez-López of At the Drive-In and the Mars Volta have cited the influence of Brainiac, especially Electro-Shock for President. Bixler-Zavala has stated:

Nearly every band is indebted to Brainiac: Blood Brothers, The Locust, At the Drive-In, also The Faint owe them a lot, and they wouldn't be afraid to admit that. Brainiac were at least the first to have this certain Devo-thing - even though it's not that, obviously: absurd vocals, heavy synths, samples of dogs and trains. All the electronic stuff on this album was done by Steve Albini and Jim O'Rourke. Brainiac recorded only three albums because the singer died in a crashed car. It's like a dark secret you can discover.

The National's Matt Berninger has also praised Brainiac, stating: "Seeing this band perform was something that would rewire your idea of a rock band. They were doing things both musically and performance-wise that seemed entirely free and unburdened by self-consciousness and insecurity. And it was organic, and honest, and fearless, and unhinged. They were channeling something very healing and potent. They were way out on a strange limb all by themselves."

== Members ==
Current members

- Juan "Monostereo" Monasterio – bass, backing vocals (1992–1997, 2022–present)
- Tyler Trent – drums (1992–1997, 2022–present)
- John Schmersal – guitar, keyboards, backing vocals (1993–1997, 2022–present), lead vocals (2022–present)

Touring members

- Tim Krug – lead and backing vocals, keyboards, guitar (2022–present)

Past members

- Tim Taylor – lead vocals, keyboards, guitar (1992–1997; died 1997)
- Michelle Bodine – guitar, backing and lead vocals (1992–1993)

== Discography ==
Studio albums

- Smack Bunny Baby (1993)
- Bonsai Superstar (1994)
- Hissing Prigs in Static Couture (1996)
