= Gern Blandsten Records =

American independent record label

- Founded: 1992; 33 years ago
- Founder: Charles Maggio
- Status: Active
- Genre: Indie rock; punk rock; emo
- Country of origin: United States of America
- Official website: gernblandsten.com

Gern Blandsten Records is an independent record label based in Paramus, New Jersey.

The label's acts have included The World/Inferno Friendship Society, Canyon, Chisel, the Van Pelt, Radio 4, The Flesh, Weston, Native Nod and Rye Coalition. Gern Blandsten also released the debut albums by Ted Leo and the Pharmacists, Liars and Dälek.

The label was founded by Rorschach's Charles Maggio in 1992, and is named after a character in a Steve Martin comedy routine from his 1979 album Comedy Is Not Pretty!.

== Roster ==
- 1.6 Band
- All Natural Lemon & Lime Flavors
- Big Boys
- Brandon Butler
- Canyon
- Chisel
- Computer Cougar
- Dälek
- The Figgs
- The Flesh
- Garden Variety
- Green Dragon
- The Holy Childhood
- The Impossible Five
- The Jai-Alai Savant
- Jett Brando
- The Lapse
- Ted Leo/Pharmacists
- The Little Killers
- Merel
- Miss TK & The Revenge
- The Movies
- Native Nod
- Oddateee
- One Blood
- One By One
- Pilot To Gunner
- Radio 4
- Rorschach
- Rye Coalition
- Sticks & Stones
- The Trans Megetti
- The Van Pelt
- Victory At Sea
- Watchers
- Weston
- The World/Inferno Friendship Society
- The Yah Mos

== See also ==
- List of record labels
