= Snowball (disambiguation) =

A snowball is a ball of snow, usually made by compacting snow with the hands.

Snowball may also refer to:

== Business and finance ==
- Snowball (finance), an "exotic" interest rate derivative
- The debt-snowball method, a debt reduction strategy

== Drugs ==
- Snowball, a cocaine party
- Snowball, another name for a cocaine-heroin speedball

== Food and drink ==
- Schneeball (pastry), a German pastry
- Snowball (cocktail), an alcoholic mixed drink
- An alternate name for snow cone; a treat of shaved ice & sugar syrup
- Sno-ball, Baltimore version of the snow cone
- Sno Balls, Hostess-brand confection
- Tunnock's Snowball, a British sweet snack
- An alternate name for Russian tea cakes

== Media, arts, and entertainment ==
=== Dances ===
- Snowball (school dance), a regional U.S. term for a type of school dance where females invite males (similar to a Sadie Hawkins dance)

=== Film ===
- Snowball (1960 film), a British crime film
- Snowball (1995 film), an Italian family adventure film
- Snowball (2020 film), a South Korean drama film
- Private Snowball, a nickname given to an African-American recruit in the film Full Metal Jacket (1987)
- Snowball, the nickname of the character Willam Black from Kevin Smith's film Clerks and the Mallrats films
- Snowball (The Secret Life of Pets), a rabbit in the animated film The Secret Life of Pets

=== Games ===
- Snowball (video game), a 1983 text adventure in the Silicon Dreams trilogy by Level 9 Computing

=== Literature and publications ===
- Snowball by Poul Anderson
- Snowball (novel), a 2013 book by Abdel Rahim Jeeran
- The Snowball (children's novel), a children's fantasy novel by Barbara Sleigh
- Snowball (Animal Farm), a character in George Orwell's political satire Animal Farm
- The Snowball: Warren Buffett and the Business of Life, a book about Warren Buffett written by Alice Schroeder

=== Music ===
- Snowball (album), 1989 debut mini-album by The Field Mice
- "Snowball", a song on Devo's album Freedom of Choice
- "Snowball", a song on The Handsome Family 2010 album Scattered

=== Television and web series ===
- Snowball (The Simpsons), a cat character in The Simpsons
- Snowball, a gene-spliced intelligent hamster who is a recurring character in the cartoon Pinky and the Brain
- Snowball, a character from the first season of Battle for Dream Island, an animated web series

== People ==
- Bertie Snowball (1887–1915), English golfer
- Betty Snowball (1908–1988), English cricketer
- Cilla Snowball (born 1958), British executive
- Cuthbert Snowball Rewcastle (1888–1962), British politician
- Jabez Bunting Snowball (1837–1907), Canadian businessman
- Oswald Snowball (1859–1928), Australian politician
- Ralph Snowball (1849–1925), Australian photographer
- Ray Snowball (born 1932), English footballer
- William Bunting Snowball (1865–1925), Canadian politician

== Places ==
- Snowball, Arkansas, an unincorporated community in Arkansas, United States
- Snowball, Ontario, a hamlet in Ontario, Canada

== Plants ==
- Abronia fragrans, prairie snowball
- Mammillaria candida, snowball cactus
- Styrax hemsleyanus, Hemsley snowball
- Viburnum × carlcephalum, fragrant snowball
- Viburnum macrocephalum, snowball bush
- Viburnum opulus, snowball tree
- Viburnum plicatum, Japanese snowball

== Technology ==
- Snowball (programming language), computing
- Snowball (single-board computer), from ST-Ericsson
- Snowball (storage device), a portable storage device from Amazon Web Services

== Other uses ==
- Snowball (cockatoo), an Eleonora cockatoo demonstrated to be capable of beat induction
- Snowball Earth, hypothesized palaeogeological era(s) proposing an entirely frozen Earth
- A codename for the 1954 Soviet Totskoye nuclear exercise
- Operation Snowball, a 1977 alcohol, tobacco and drug-use prevention program
- Operation Snowball (test), a 1964 Canadian conventional explosive test for nuclear weapon detonations

== See also ==
- SNOBOL (programming language)
- Snowballing (disambiguation)
- Snow cone
