= Tom Tiddler's Ground =

Children's game

Tom Tiddler's ground, also known as Tom Tidler's ground or Tommy Tiddler's ground, is a longstanding children's game. One player, "Tom Tiddler", stands on a heap of stones, gravel, etc. Other players rush onto the heap, crying "Here I am on Tom Tiddler's ground, picking up gold and silver," while Tom tries to capture, or in other versions, expel the invaders. By extension the phrase has come to mean the ground or tenement of a sluggard, or of one easily outwitted; or to mean any place where money is picked up and acquired readily. The essence of the game lives on in more modern versions such as steal the bacon and variants of tag.

== In literature ==
"Tom Tiddler's Ground" is the title of an 1861 set of short stories by Charles Dickens, Wilkie Collins, Charles Allston Collins, Amelia Edwards and John Harwood, published in All the Year Round. The phrase "Tom Tiddler's ground" also appears in Dickens's novels Nicholas Nickleby, David Copperfield and Dombey and Son. M. R. James quotes a passage from this set as the preface for his "Rats" horror short story published in 1931.

Tom Tiddler's Ground is also the title of an 1886 memoir by Florence Marryat.

It is the title of a 1931 poem and it appears in a 1931 anthology of children's poetry edited by Walter de la Mare, who also wrote a short story titled "Miss Duveen".

It's also the title of a 1934 novel by Edward Shanks.

E. F. Benson mentions "Tom Tiddler's ground" in his 1935 novel The Worshipful Lucia.

Nancy Mitford in The Pursuit of Love (1949) writes, "Their life with Uncle Matthew was a sort of perpetual Tom Tiddler's ground."

The phrase is also the name for a piece of waste land in the 1962 children's novel No One Must Know by Barbara Sleigh.

The gold and silver coins in chapter 16 of C. S. Forester's Hornblower and the Atropos are said to be on Tom Tiddler's Ground.

In Agatha Christie's novel, The Mirror Crack'd from Side to Side (1962), William Tiddler, a police sergeant who assists Chief Inspector Craddock, is referred to by colleagues as "Tom Tiddler".

Detective-Sergeant Tiddler grinned appreciatively. His name was not Tom, it was William, but the combination of Tom Tiddler had always been too much for his colleagues.

Author Ursula Orange wrote a novel in 1941 titled "Tom Tiddler’s Ground" and describes Tom Tiddler’s ground as a patch in a person’s life that they are not proud of, keep to themselves, and chase others away.

== Other uses ==
"Tom Tiddler's Ground" is a song on the 1970 album Flat Baroque and Berserk by Roy Harper.

The sung phrase "Here I am on Tom Tiddler's ground, picking up gold and silver" also appears in the second story of British supernatural series Sapphire & Steel, sung by character Sapphire (Joanna Lumley) while in a mediumistic trance, and later partially by Steel (David McCallum).

Tom Tiddler's ground is also used in modern English as a euphemism for having an uncertain status, for example, "I asked her why her performance review was late and I could tell she was on Tom Tiddler's ground".

== See also ==
- King of the Hill (game)
