= The Snowball =

The Snowball may refer to:

- The Snowball: Warren Buffett and the Business of Life
- The Snowball (children's novel)

== See also ==
- Snowball (disambiguation)
