= Ice eggs =

Rare natural phenomenon

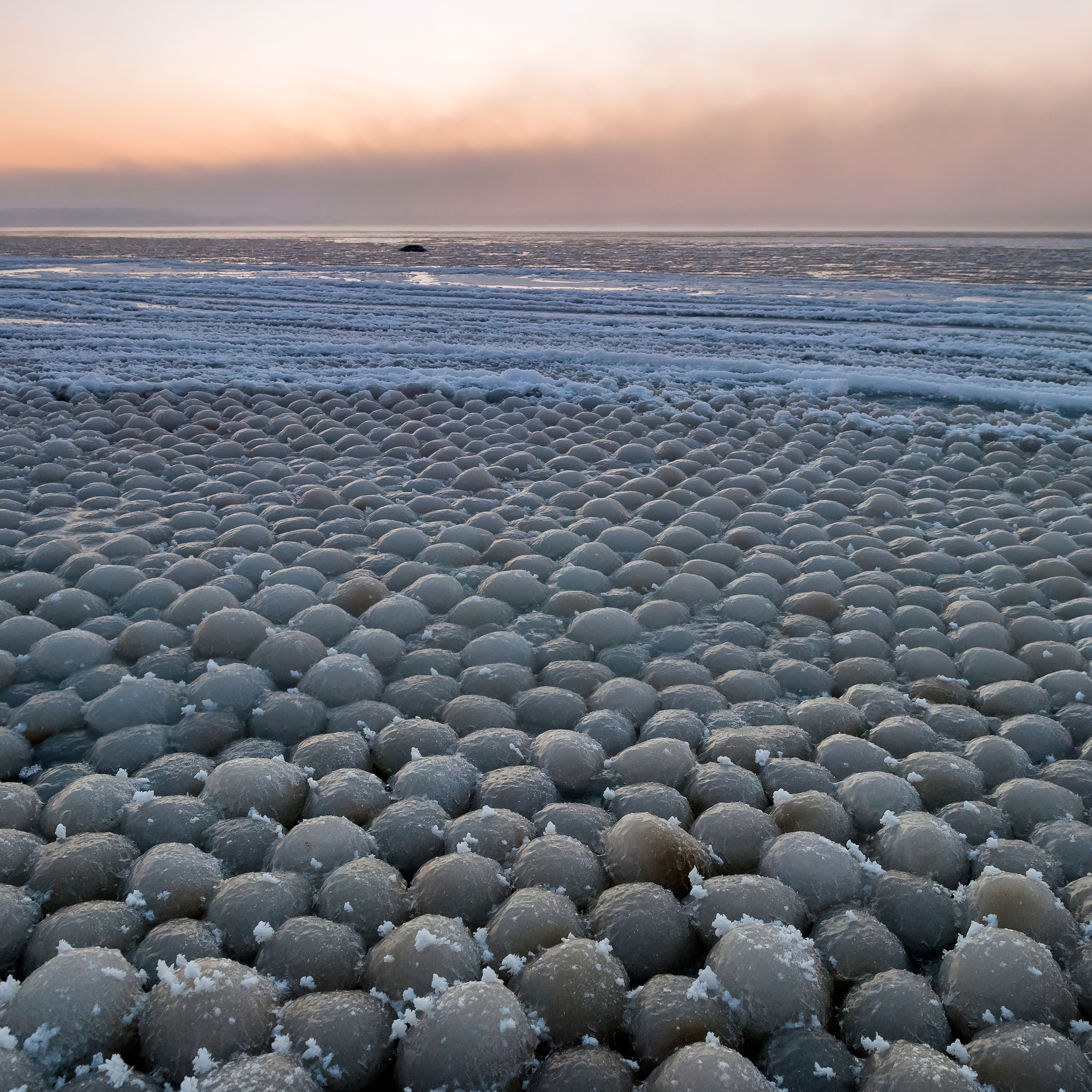
Formation of ice eggs (diameter 5–10 cm) on Stroomi Beach, Tallinn, Estonia. Temperature was around minus 15–20 degrees Celsius.

Ice eggs, or ice balls, are a rare phenomenon caused by a process in which small pieces of sea ice in open water are rolled over by wind and currents in freezing conditions and grow into spheroid pieces of ice. They may collect into heaps of balls or 'eggs' on beaches where they pack together in striking patterns.

The gentle churn of water, blown by a suitably stiff breeze makes concentric layers of ice form on a seed particle that then grows into the floating ball as it rolls through the freezing currents.

Given enough time, the frozen balls can grow to become boulder size. In 2016, giant snowballs washed up on a beach in Siberia, some measuring a metre (about 3 feet) across.

An ice specialist from the Finnish Meteorological Institute has been quoted as saying ice balls are rare, but not unprecedented, and occur about once a year on the Finnish coastline as conditions allow.

They also appear on the North American Great Lakes along with pancake ice, forming in the middle of the lake, where they are called ice balls.

== See also ==
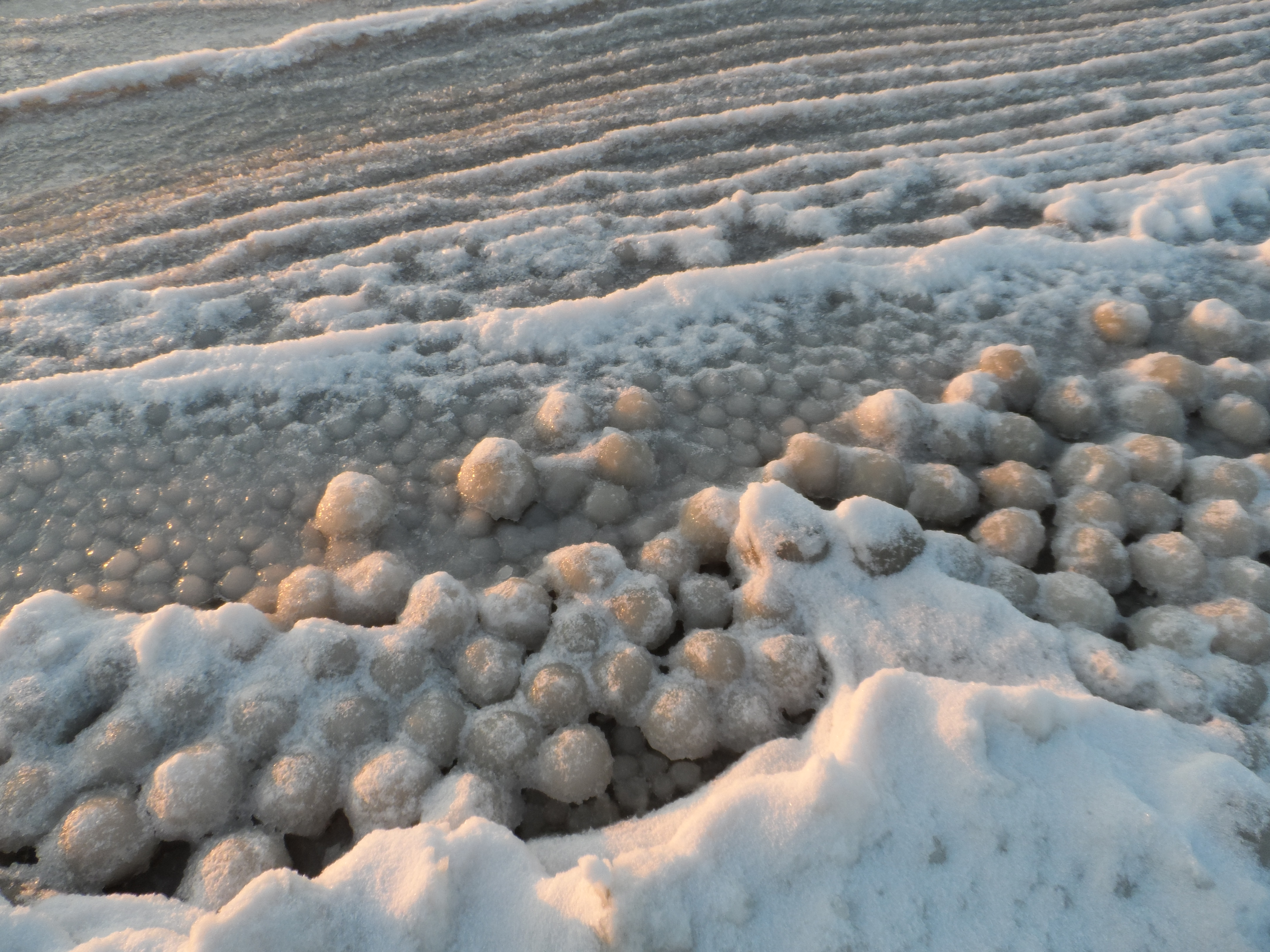
Ice balls in Kopli Bay, Estonia

- Yukimarimo – Wind blown balls of fine frost accumulated by electrostatic attraction in polar conditions.
- Snow roller – Naturally formed snowballs on mountainsides which accumulate as snow rolls down the slope. They are usually cylinders.
- Snowball – An artificial spherical object made from snow, usually created by scooping snow with the hands, and pressing the snow together to compact it into a ball.
