= Snowball =

Spherical object made from compacted snow

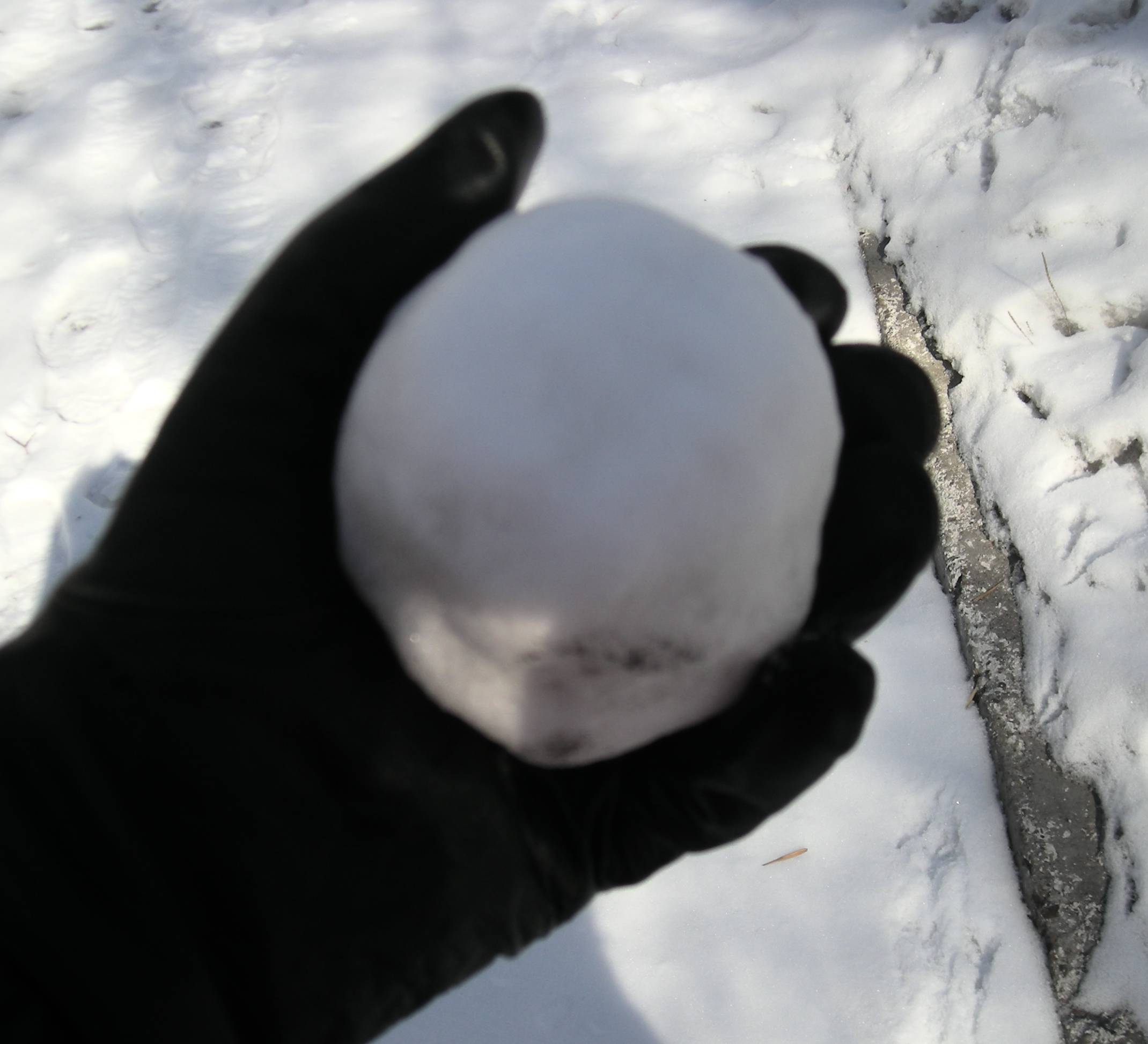
A snowball

A snowball is a spherical object made from snow, usually created by scooping snow with the hands and pressing the snow together to compact it into a ball. Snowballs are often used in games such as snowball fights.

A snowball may also be a large ball of snow formed by rolling a smaller snowball on a snow-covered surface. The smaller snowball grows by picking up additional snow as it rolls. The terms "snowball effect" and "snowballing" are derived from this process. The Welsh dance "Y Gasseg Eira" also takes its name from an analogy with rolling a large snowball. This method of forming a large snowball is often used to create the components needed to build a snowman.

The underlying physical process that makes snowballs possible is sintering, in which a solid mass is compacted while near the melting point. Scientific theories about snowball formation began with a lecture by Michael Faraday in 1842, examining the attractive forces between ice particles. An influential early explanation by James Thomson invoked regelation, in which a solid is melted by pressure and then re-frozen.

== When and how ==
When forming a snowball by packing, the pressure exerted by the hands on the snow is a determinant for the final result. Reduced pressure leads to a light and soft snowball. Compacting humid or "packing" snow by applying a high pressure produces a harder snowball, sometimes called an ice ball, which can injure an opponent during a snowball fight.

Temperature is important for snowball formation. It is hard to make a good snowball if the snow is too cold. In addition, snowballs are difficult to form with dry powdery snow. In temperatures below 0 °C (32 °F), there is little free water in the snow, which leads to crumbly snowballs. At 0 °C (32 °F) or above, melted water in the snow results in a better cohesion. Above a certain temperature, however, the snowball becomes slush, which lacks mechanical strength and no longer sticks together. This effect is used in the rule that, in skiing areas, there is a high risk of avalanche if it is possible to squeeze water out of a snowball.

== Natural snowballs ==
Under certain conditions, natural snowballs may form as a result of wind, without human intervention. These conditions are:

- The ground must have a top layer of ice. This will prevent the snowball from sticking to the ground.
- That ice must have some wet and loose snow that is near its melting point.
- The wind must be strong enough to push the snowballs, but not too strong.

In Antarctica, small windblown frost balls form through a different process that relies on electrostatic attraction; these wind-rolled frost balls are known as yukimarimo.

Under other rare circumstances, in coastal and river areas, wave action on ice and snow may create beach snowballs or ball ice.

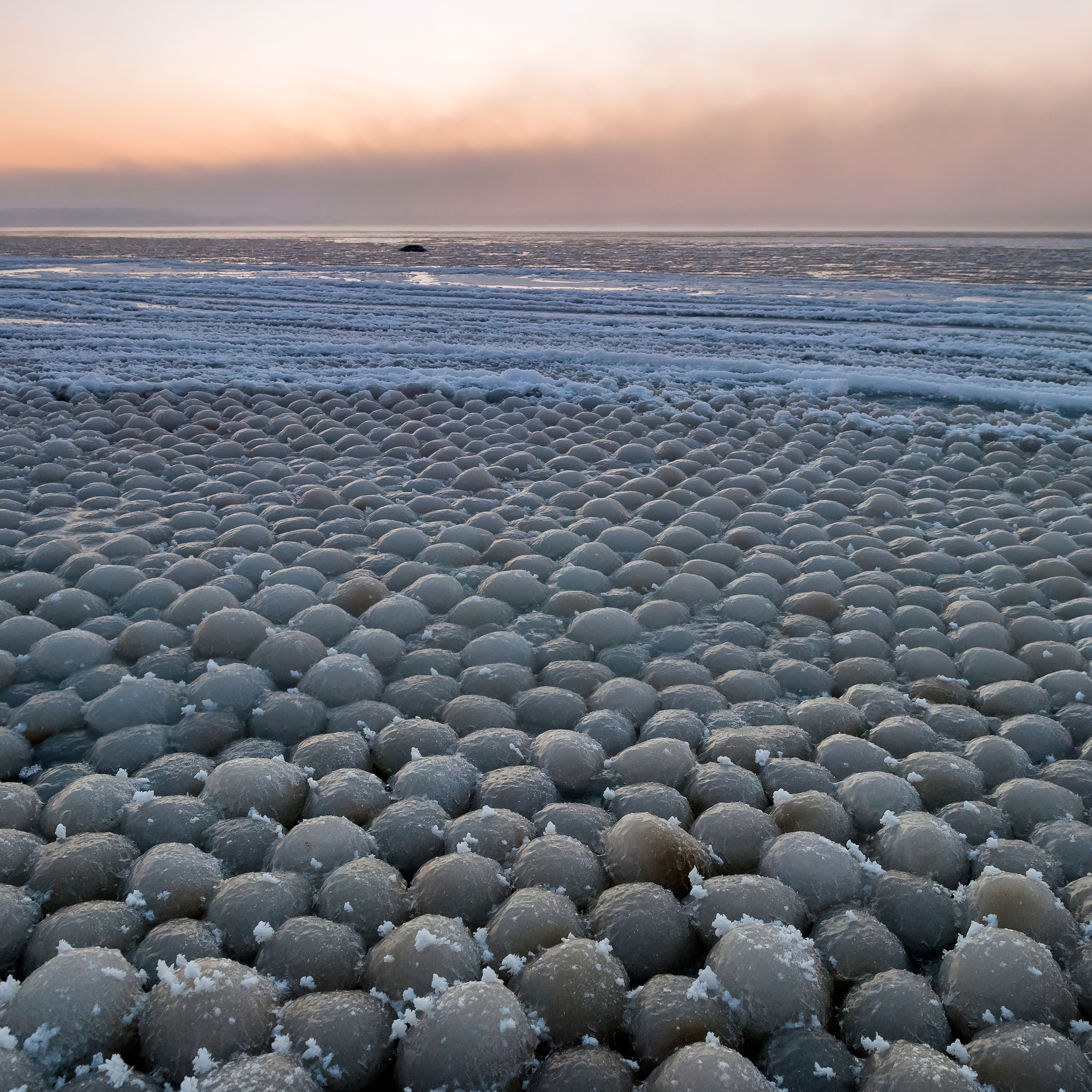
Ball ice

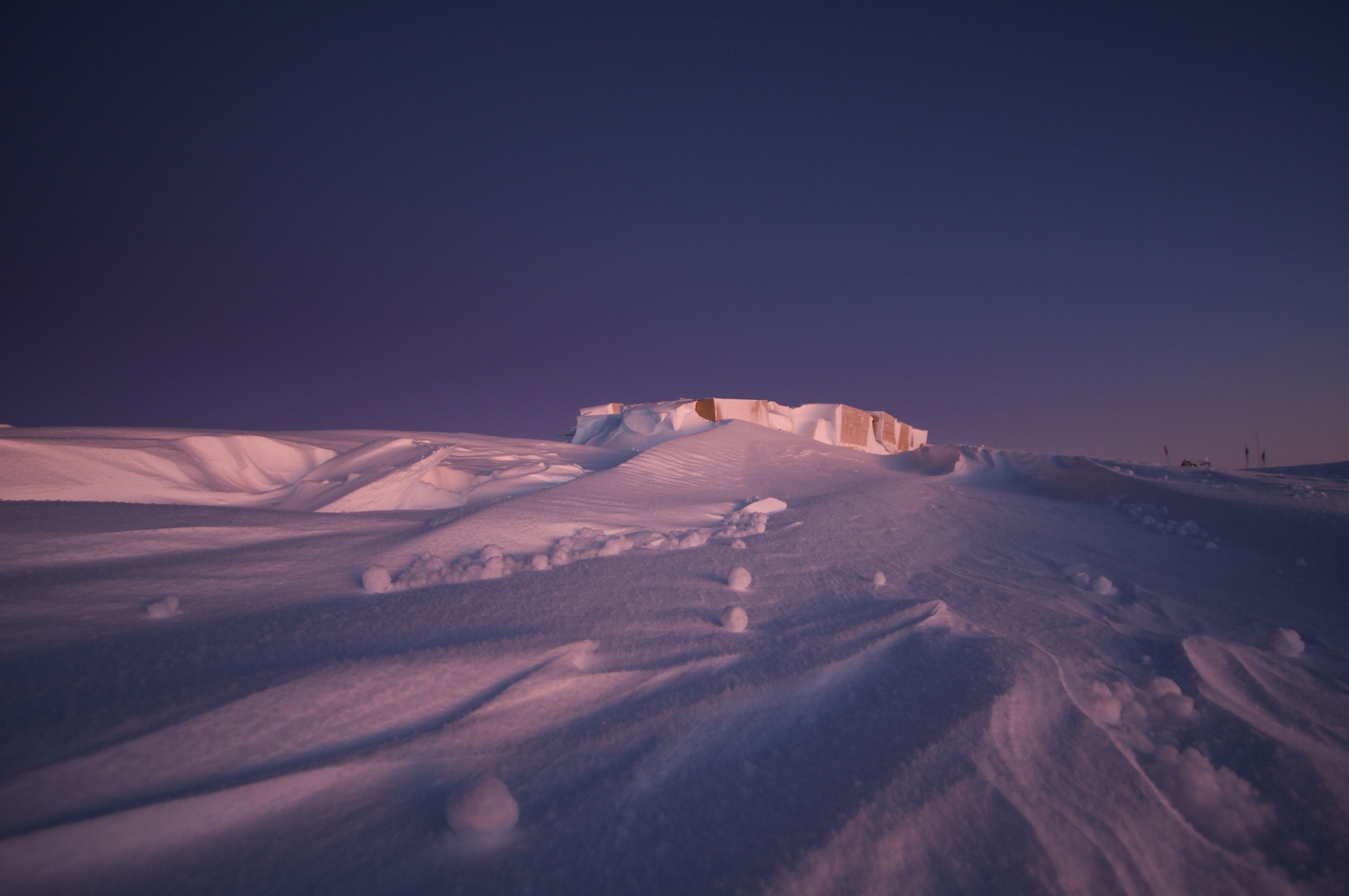
Yukimarimo

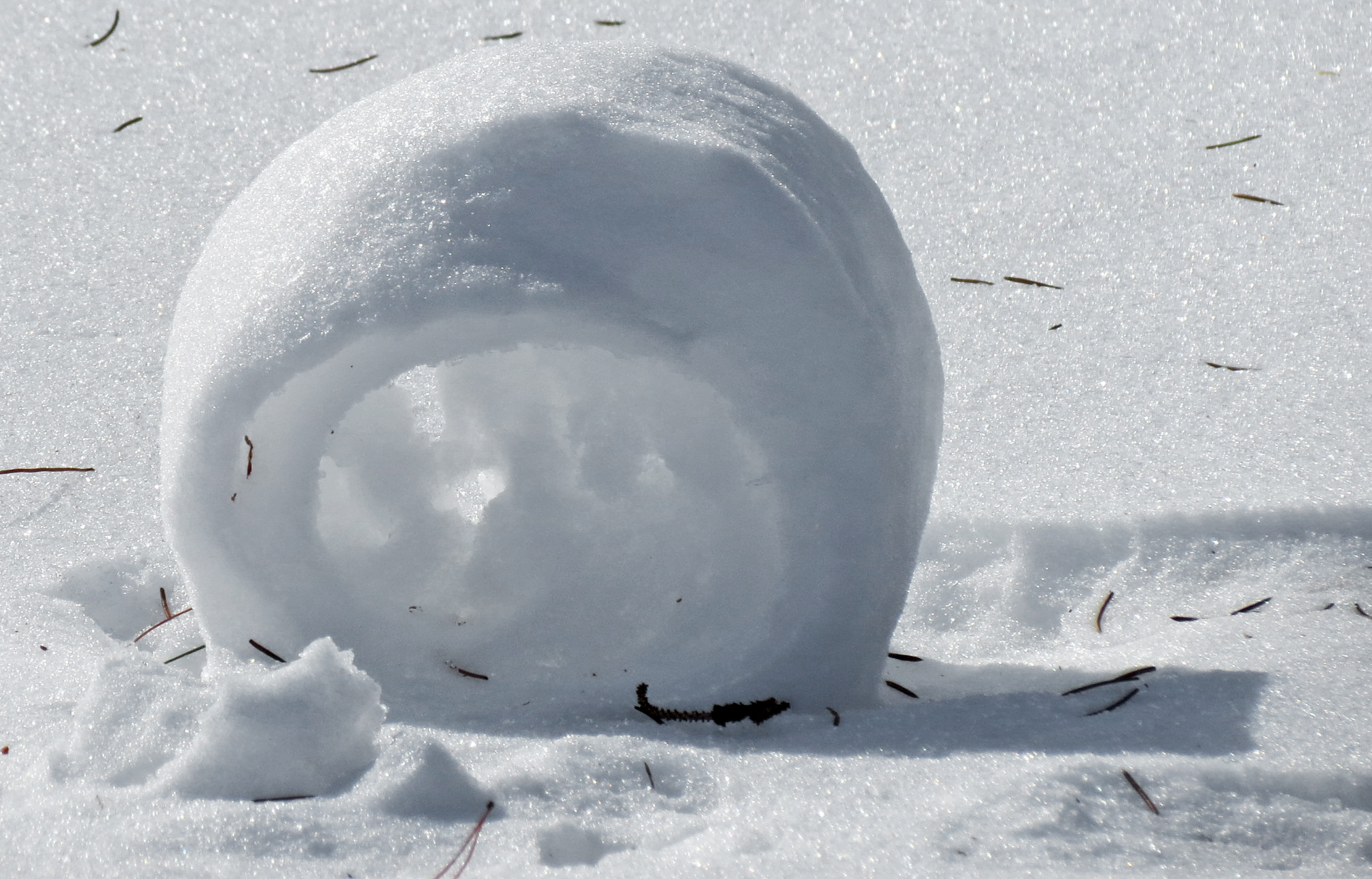
Wind-rolled snowball

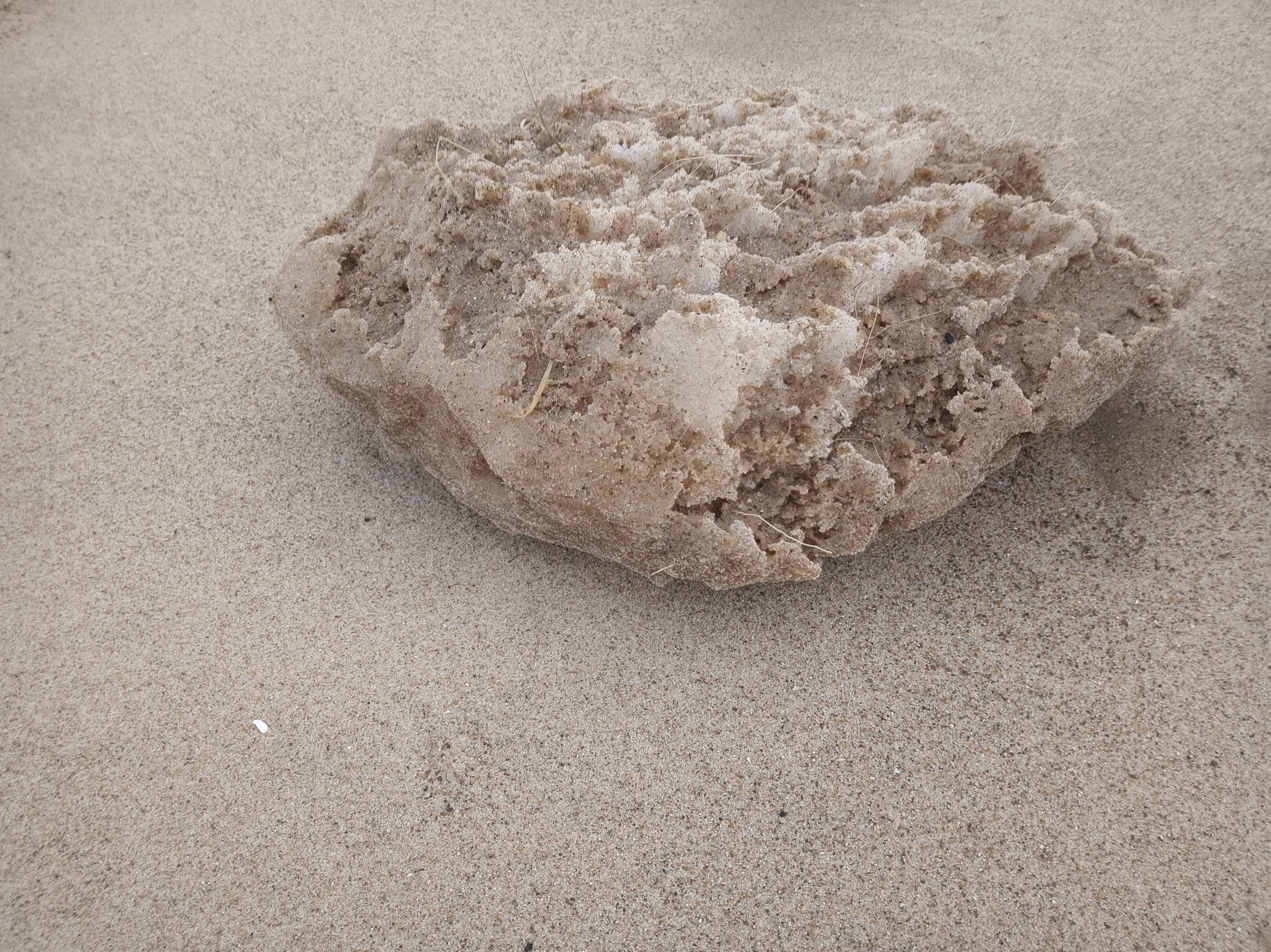
Beach snowball showing signs of denivation

== Snow lanterns ==
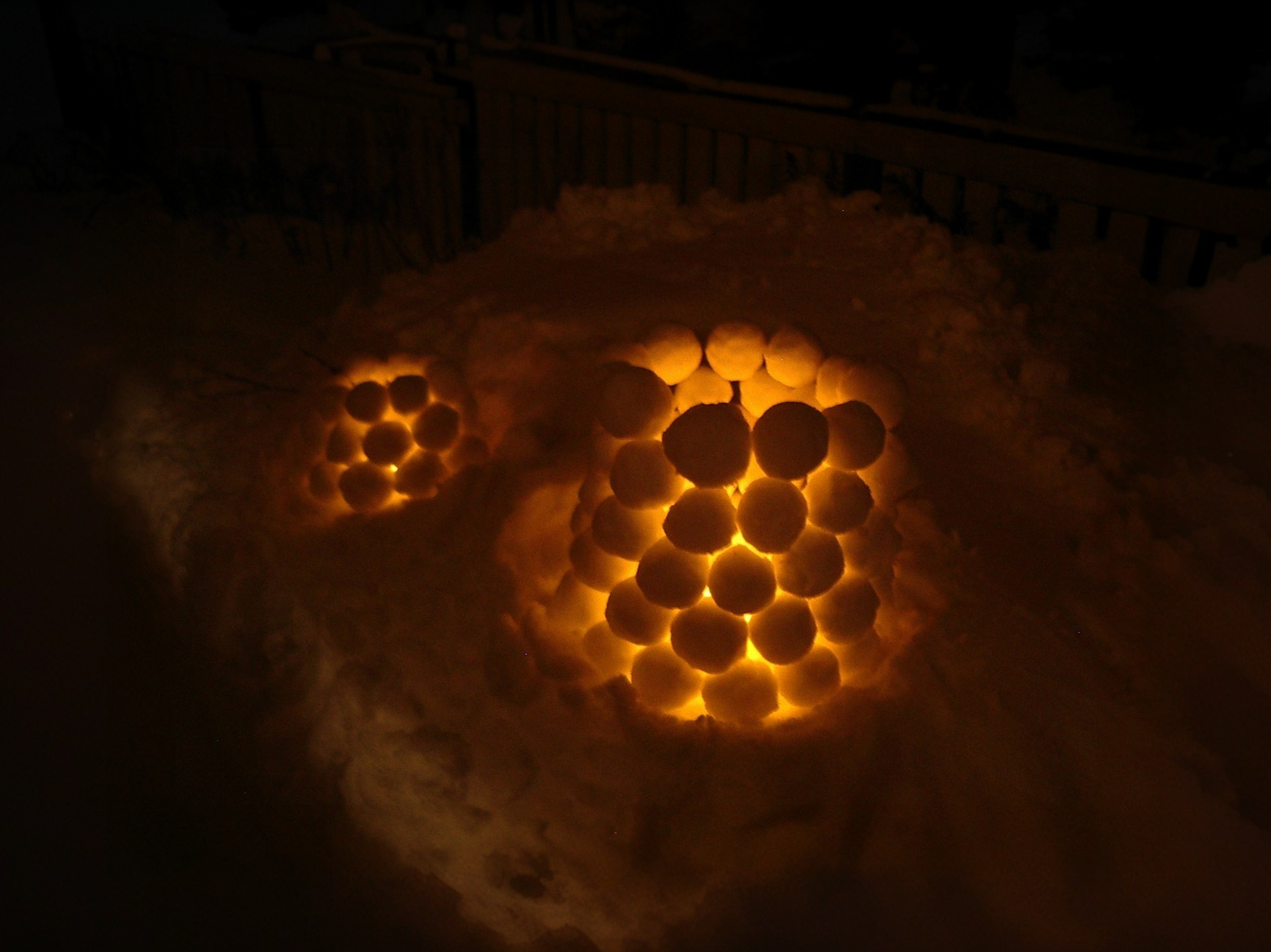
Snowball lanterns

A snow lantern is a decorative structure made from snowballs, typically shaped into a hollow cone. It is commonly used as a housing for a light source, such as a candle or a Japanese stone garden lantern known as Yukimi Gata. Snow lanterns are part of winter traditions in countries such as Sweden, Finland, and Norway, where they are created and lit during the Christmas season. These structures illuminate the winter landscape and are associated with festive celebrations in snowy regions.

== Literary allusion ==
A snowball that turns into a child is a protagonist in a 1969 children's fantasy novel, The Snowball, by Barbara Sleigh.

== Gallery ==
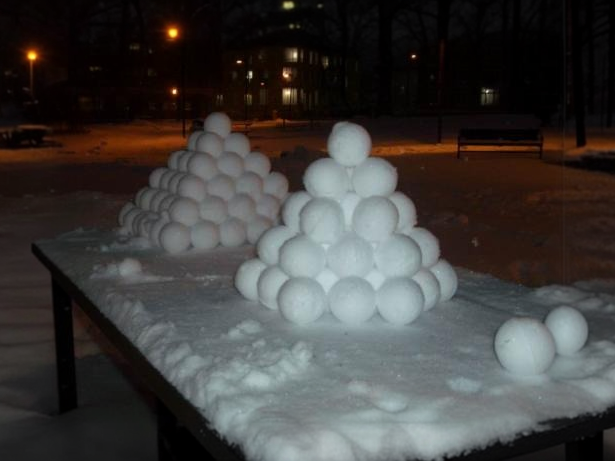
Collections of snowballs arranged in pyramid shape

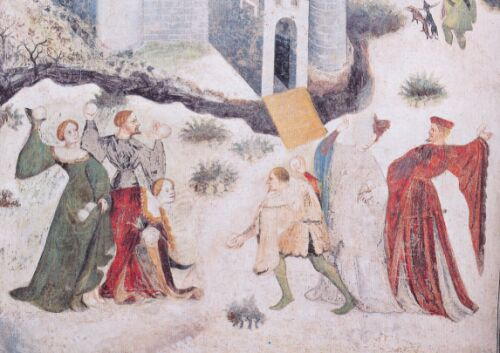
A medieval image from Italy of people throwing snowballs (c. 1400)

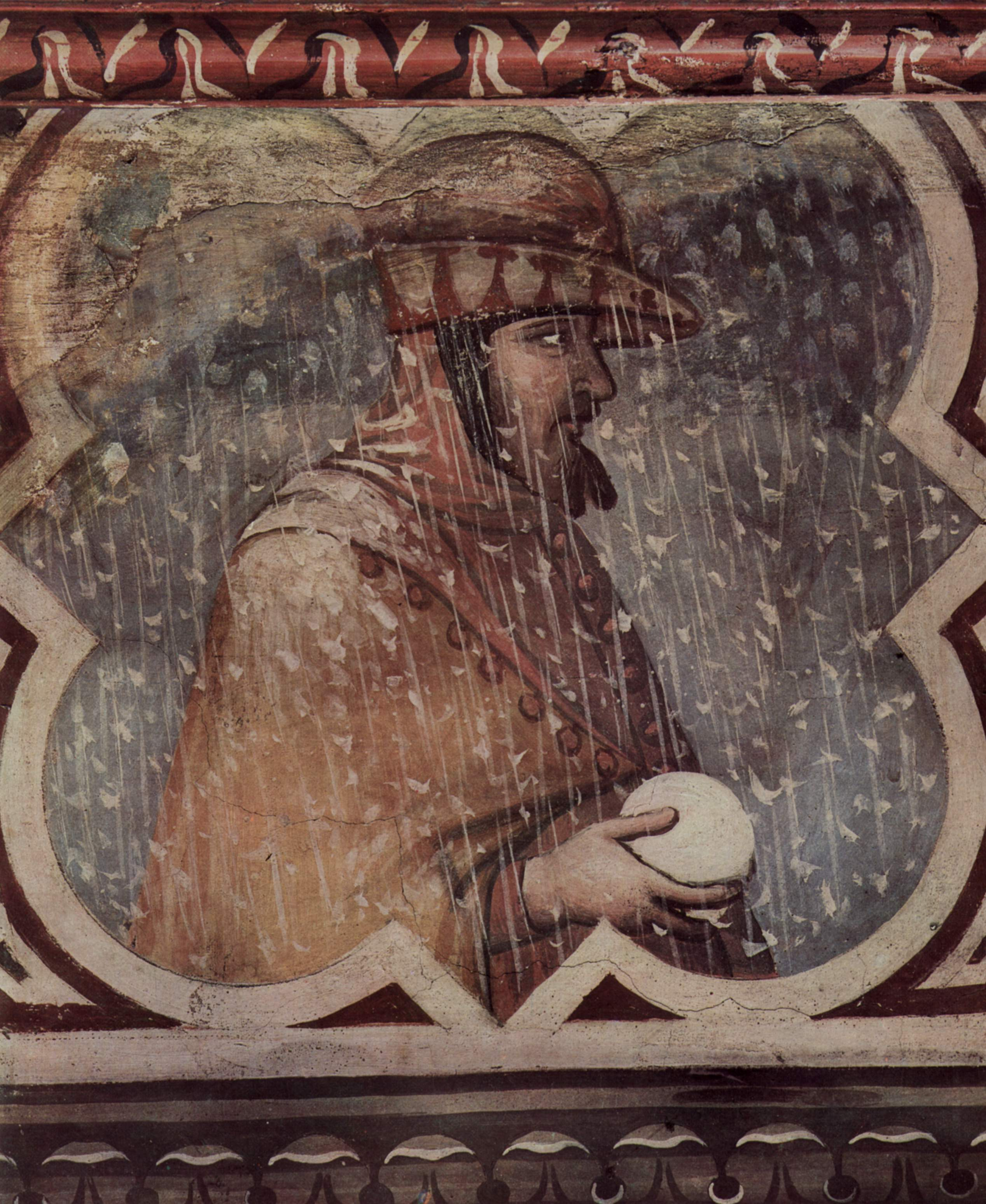
Ambrogio Lorenzetti's Winter (c. 1338–1340)
