= Jessamy =

1967 novel by Barbara Sleigh

- First edition (UK)
- Author: Barbara Sleigh
- Illustrator: Philip Gough
- Language: English
- Genre: Children's novel; Time travel
- Publisher: Collins, Bobbs Merrill
- Publication date: 1967
- Publication place: United Kingdom United States
- Media type: Print (hardcover)
- Pages: 159 pp
- LC Class: PZ7.S6317 Je (US)

Jessamy (1967) is a children's book by Barbara Sleigh, author of the Carbonel series. It sheds light on English life and childhood in the First World War, through a good-natured pre-adolescent female character, presented in detail, and a realistically written time-slip narrative.

== The setting ==
The story is about an orphaned girl called Jessamy, whose unstated age is about nine to eleven. She lives with one aunt during school term and another during school holidays. Both aunts are superficially affectionate, but neither pays heed to her as a person. The book begins with her arrival unaccompanied by train, to find that her "holiday" aunt's uncongenial children have caught whooping cough. Jessamy has to be farmed out for the summer to Miss Brindle, the childless caretaker of an empty Victorian mansion: Posset Place.

Jessamy is taken aback by the old Miss Brindle, who in turn is wary of children: "I daresay you won't mind being treated like a grown-up person. I don't know any other way," she is told (p. 14). Once Jessamy has reassured her – "I'll try not to be a menace" (p. 13) – she is allowed to explore the house and comes across a schoolroom. She opens a large empty cupboard and sees three sets of old pencil marks on the door showing the heights of four children, one of them, appearing only in the first set, named Jessamy, like her. She is exhausted that night and goes to bed, only to be woken by moonlight shining through her window. She puts on a dressing gown and steals back to the schoolroom with an electric torch. "Her bare feet seemed to take charge of her, almost as if they knew the way themselves" (p. 25).

This time she finds clothes hanging in the cupboard and only the first set of pencil marks on the door. Beside them is a date: "July 23rd, 1914" (p. 25), precisely 52 years before, and two weeks before Britain declares war on Germany. A drip of hot wax on her hand signals that her torch has turned itself into a candle.

== The time slip ==
Sleigh takes great care with the join between the two narratives.

Jessamy herself is puzzled: "'This is a dream, it must be!' she said. 'I'm sound asleep in the camp bed really.'" (p. 26) Jessamy had been reading Frances Hodgson Burnett's The Secret Garden (1911) on the train (p. 7), and there is something secret about the way the holiday aunt and Jessamy step from a modern street into the walled garden round a house that Jessamy feels looks "half like a church, and half like a castle with those battlements and stained glass windows and things". (p. 14)

Back in time, Jessamy finds she fell from a tree the previous day and should be recovering in bed from concussion. She is thought to have suffered some memory loss, which happily accounts for some of her uneasy questions. She is discovered by a parlour maid, Matchett, who is up and in street clothes suspiciously late, and asks crossly what she was doing in the cupboard, "'I don't quite remember,' Jessamy heard herself say slowly. 'I think I was looking for something.'" (p. 28)

The time slip corresponds to a change in Jessamy's circumstances. In the present day she has little companionship and wishes she could attend boarding school. In her 1914 situation she is taken in by the cook-housekeeper, Mrs Rumbold, who acts as an aunt to her and gives her work about the house. She forms a friendship with the younger boy Kitto and comes into conflict with his sister Fanny. She also moves between two parts of the household: below stairs with the staff, and above stairs in the schoolroom with the children of the family, who are orphaned like herself and are being raised by an older sister and a wealthy grandfather, the owner of a pharmaceutical factory (the source of the name Posset Place for the house).

The duality in the story continues, with Jessamy turning over in her present-day mind what is happening to her in a different life: "Quite suddenly Jessamy realised that she was very hungry. The faint rumble of her inside was reassuring. It belonged to the Jessamy of both worlds." (p. 37)

== The theft ==
Against this new-found love, companionship, and contentment, Sleigh sets about outlining Jessamy's new worth. The grandfather Mr Parkinson, owner of Posset Place, takes Jessamy, his grandson Kitto and the groom William Stubbins to an auction, where he buys a medieval book of hours for the large sum of £300. The eldest boy Harry, everybody's favourite, then returns from Oxford, set upon joining the army instead of completing his final year, and burdened by debts. After a dreadful row and Harry's departure in the night, the book of hours is found to be missing. Mr Parkinson assumes Harry has stolen it, but Jessamy, Kitto and others are appalled by the charge. Not so, apparently, the parlour maid Matchett or her lover, William the groom.

Trust is a recurrent theme in the book. On arrival in the earlier Posset Place, Jessamy promises Matchett, who is up late at night, not to betray her love affair. Soon after, Fanny grudgingly thanks her for not revealing that her fall from the mulberry tree came about because Fanny pushed her. Now she sets about helping Fanny again, for Fanny has borrowed her elder sister's mother-of-pearl penknife without asking, and left it in the tree house at the time of Jessamy's fall. Disobeying Mr Parkinson's orders to the children never to climb the tree again, Jessamy goes up to retrieve the knife, but is caught in the act. Again there is a row, and it looks as if Jessamy's escapade may cost Mrs Rumbold her job on the domestic staff. But Jessamy manages to slip the penknife to Kitto, and the danger to Mrs Rumbold passes when Fanny comes clean about why Jessamy has been up the forbidden tree. Returning to the schoolroom later, Jessamy goes to the cupboard to see if Fanny's hat is there and she has returned from a walk. The door of the cupboard shuts behind Jessamy and she finds herself back in the present, again wearing her dressing gown and holding not a candle, but her torch.

== The aftermath ==
Back in the present, Jessamy has a second fall when the paper boy, Billy, opens the gate suddenly and knocks her over. But some of the improvement Jessamy has found in her 1914 life is matched in the present. She befriends Billy and tells him her story, as if she were just making it up. She becomes fond of Miss Brindle, the caretaker, and helps her in the house. She enjoys a seaside holiday with her aunt, despite the petulance of her cousins. But examining the second set of dated marks in the cupboard, from 1915, convinces Jessamy that if she is ever to get back to the other Posset Place, it will have to be on August 14. She succeeds, picks up the strands, and becomes skilled at soothing Billy, the baby boy of Matchett, by then Mrs Stubbins with a husband away in the army. One day Jessamy and Kitto take along the baby in his pram when they go to deliver some magazines to a military hospital. There in a ward Jessamy finds Harry, lying in bed with his arm amputated.

It is soon clear to Jessamy and Kitto that Harry does not even know the theft of the book of hours has occurred. They engineer a reconciliation between him and his grandfather, but the book remains unfound. The children's suspicions fall on the Stubbinses. Jessamy corners Mrs Stubbins into admitting, under a vow of secrecy, that her husband stole it, but she does not know where he hid it, and he is away at the war. The note he has written giving its whereabouts is with his will, in an envelope which Mrs Stubbins has promised not to open unless her husband should be killed. Jessamy, however, finds the envelope tucked down the side of the pram, opens it and takes out the note. She is seen doing so by Mrs Stubbins, who chases her, so that she is unable to read it. She manages to crumple the note and tuck it into the mouth of a tiger hearth rug in the drawing room, but Mrs Stubbins chases her up to the schoolroom, where Jessamy hides in the cupboard – and promptly returned to the present.

Back in the present a second time, it emerges that the paper boy Billy is the grandson of Stubbins the groom, who after all died in the war. Furthermore, it emerges from remarks made by her holiday aunt that Jessamy's forebear, whose name was Jessamy too, lived as a child at Posset Place with an aunt who was on the staff. There is one more set of marks in the cupboard, dated September 10, 1916, but Jessamy, to her sorrow, fails to slip back in time on that day. Later, Billy and Jessamy fix a swing to an old bough of the mulberry tree, which breaks off, revealing the book of hours hidden in a crack, just where the tree house used to be. It is damp and discoloured, but Miss Brindle shows it to the house agent, who shows it to the present owner of Posset Place. He is delighted to have it, for when the present-day Jessamy visits him at his request, he turns out to be the now aged Kitto. Dramatic irony appears: "'You must forgive me, my dear,' he said, 'I'm afraid I may have been talking nonsense.... I almost thought I was talking to the other Jessamy, the one I used to know. You were so like her in the half dark.'" (p. 157) Not long after, Kitto writes to Jessamy offering to pay for her to go to boarding school, as she so much wants to do. (p. 159)

== Reception ==
Kirkus Reviews considered the story to be "tellingly told", noting that it had "so much of the intrigue and fantasy that a young girl loves to daydream over".

Jessamy appeared simultaneously in 1967 in the UK (London: Collins) and the United States (Indianapolis: Bobbs Merrill). The novel was translated into Swedish under the same title in 1968, by Stina Hergin, younger sister of the children's author Astrid Lindgren. A German translation entitled Der Spuk im alten Schrank (The spook – or mischief – in the old cupboard), by Marie-Louise Dumont and illustrated by Sita Jucker, also appeared in 1968.
