= Carbonel: The King of the Cats =

English children's book by Barbara Sleigh

- First US edition
- Author: Barbara Sleigh
- Language: English
- Series: Carbonel series
- Genre: Children's novel
- Publisher: Max Parrish (UK); Bobbs-Merrill (US)
- Publication date: 1955
- Publication place: United Kingdom
- Media type: Print (Hardback & Paperback)
- Followed by: The Kingdom of Carbonel

Carbonel (published in the US as Carbonel: The King of the Cats) is a children's book by Barbara Sleigh, published in 1955 by Max Parrish in England and Bobbs-Merrill in the US. It is based on a folk tale from the British Isles known as "The King of the Cats". Carbonel was illustrated by V. H. Drummond.

Sleigh wrote two sequels, The Kingdom of Carbonel (Max Parrish, 1959; Bobbs-Merrill, 1960) and Carbonel and Calidor: Being the Further Adventures of a Royal Cat (Kestrel Books, 1978; Puffin Books, 1980), making the Carbonel series.

== Plot summary ==
A girl named Rosemary buys a broom and a cat from Mrs Cantrip, an untidy woman in the market place. When to Rosemary's surprise the cat starts talking to her, she learns that the woman is a witch, selling her possessions to start a new career.

Moreover, the cat, Carbonel, just happens to be King of the Cats, presumed missing by his subjects since the witch abducted him. Unfortunately, he cannot return to his throne until the enslavement spell Mrs Cantrip cast on him is undone. Rosemary, together with a new friend John, have to learn a little witchcraft themselves before tracking down Mrs Cantrip to obtain her at best ambivalent help.

== Main characters ==
- Rosemary Brown – who buys Carbonel
- Carbonel – the cat protagonist
- Rosemary's mother – a poor widow and seamstress
- Mrs Cantrip – kidnapper of Carbonel and a (semi-retired) witch
- John – Rosemary's friend, and the nephew of Mrs Brown's employer

== Publication history ==
- 1955, UK, Max Parrish, publication date 1955, hardback (first edition)
- 1957, US, Bobbs-Merrill, publication date 1957, hardback
- 1961, UK, Puffin Books, publication date 1961, paperback
- 1973, UK, Longman Young Books, hardback
- 2004, US, New York Review of Books ISBN 1-59017-126-8, publication date Nov 2004, hardback
- 2005, UK, Puffin Books ISBN 0-14-131973-9, publication date 25 August 2005

== Adaptations ==
In 1955, Carbonel was adapted by Sleigh as a serial in six parts on BBC Home Service's Children's Hour, produced by Eve Burgess. It was adapted again in 1959, produced by her husband David Davis, followed by an adaptation of The Kingdom of Carbonel in 1960.
