= Carbonel series =

Children's book series by Barbara Sleigh

The Carbonel trilogy is a children's book series by Barbara Sleigh, published between 1955 and 1978, and inspired by the British folk tale "The King of the Cats". It comprises three books: Carbonel (1955), The Kingdom of Carbonel (1959), and Carbonel and Calidor (1978). Carbonel was named a "Book of the Month" by The Young Elizabethan magazine, and described as a "most sensible, it-could-easily-have-happened fairy story".

Carbonel was illustrated by V. H. Drummond, The Kingdom of Carbonel by D. M. Leonard (though subsequent editions were illustrated by Richard Kennedy), and Carbonel and Calidor by Charles Front. In the United States, the first book was given the title Carbonel: The King of the Cats. The 50th anniversary Puffin edition was titled Carbonel: The Prince of Cats.

== Premise ==
The plot concerns a girl named Rosemary who buys a broom and a cat from an untidy woman in the marketplace. When the cat starts talking to her she learns that she has encountered a witch, selling up to start a new career. Moreover, the cat, Carbonel, just happens to be King of the Cats, presumed missing by his subjects ever since the witch Mrs. Cantrip abducted him. Unfortunately he cannot return to his throne until the enslavement spell Mrs. Cantrip cast on him is undone, and so Rosemary, together with her friend John, have to learn a little witchcraft and track down Mrs. Cantrip for her, at best ambivalent help.

== Analysis ==
The first two books are more closely linked than the third.

Carbonel has been said to have few real cat characteristics; he is more like Edith Nesbit's Psammead in Five Children and It (1902), speaking "with the voice of tart and faintly impatient adulthood".

Cats (albeit non-speaking ones) are also central to Sleigh's stand-alone novel No One Must Know (1962), about children hiding a cat and her kittens from a landlord who has banned pets.

== Publishing history ==
- Carbonel (Max Parrish, 1955; Bobbs-Merrill, 1957; Puffin Books, 1961; Longman Young, 1973; New York Review Books, 2004). Illustrated by V. H. Drummond.
- The Kingdom of Carbonel (Max Parrish, 1959; Bobbs-Merrill, 1960; Clarke Irwin, 1960; Puffin Books, 1971; Longman Young, 1973; Kestrel Books, 1977; New York Review Books, 2009). Early editions illustrated by D. M. Leonard; later editions by Richard Kennedy.
- Carbonel and Calidor (Kestrel Books, 1978; Puffin Books, 1980; New York Review Books, 2009). Illustrated by Charles Front.

== Adaptations ==
In 1955, Carbonel was adapted by Sleigh as a serial in six parts on BBC Home Service's Children's Hour, produced by Eve Burgess. It was adapted again in 1959, produced by her husband David Davis, followed by an adaptation of The Kingdom of Carbonel in 1960.
