= King of Cats =

King of Cats may refer to:

- Tybalt, who was called "king of cats" by Mercutio in Romeo and Juliet
- The King of the Cats, also known as The King o' the Cats, a British folktale
  - Carbonel: The King of the Cats, 1955 book based on the folktale
