= Snowballing =

Snowballing often refers to a situation which rapidly gets out of control, as when a snow ball grows larger while rolling downhill.

Snowballing might also refer to:

== Economy ==
- A situation in which the exercise of stop orders in a declining market or advancing market or specific share creates further downward or upward pressure, triggering more stop orders, magnifying the decline or advance
- Debt-snowball method: A method of paying down credit card debt by paying the minimum on all balances, except the one with the highest interest rate

== Games ==
- The throwing of snowballs
- Snowballing (gaming), a situation where a player or faction is able to leverage a small advantage into a larger and larger advantage.

== Science and engineering ==
- In social science research, snowball sampling, or "snowballing": a technique for developing a research sample
- In researching a field, snowballing is another name for Pearl growing
- In chemical and industrial engineering, snowballing is the second and last phase, after aggregation, of the pelletization process.

== Other uses ==
- Bataille de boules de neige, an 1896 French silent film also known as Snowballing
- Snowballing (sexual practice), the act of spitting semen into a partner's mouth after oral sex

== See also ==
- Snowball (disambiguation)
- Snowball, a spherical object made from snow
