= John Harwood =

John Harwood may refer to:

- John Berwick Harwood (1828–1899), English ghost story writer
- John Harwood (watchmaker) (1893–1965), English horologist who developed first self-winding watch
- John Harwood (writer) (born 1946), Australian poet, literary critic and novelist
- John B. Harwood (born 1952), American politician from Rhode Island
- John Harwood (journalist) (born 1956), American TV news correspondent
