= The House by The Thames =

2006 book by Gillian Tindall

The House by The Thames: and the people who lived there
- Author: Gillian Tindall
- Language: English
- Subject: History of London
- Set in: Southwark, London Borough of Southwark
- Publisher: Chatto & Windus, Pimlico
- Publication date: 2006
- Publication place: United Kingdom
- Media type: Print (paperback)
- Pages: 258
- ISBN: 9781844130948
- Dewey Decimal: 942.164

The House by The Thames: and the people who lived there is a 2006 book by British writer Gillian Tindall. A second edition was released in 2007 by Pimlico.

== Synopsis ==
The book is about a 450-year-old house, 49 Bankside, Bankside in the London Borough of Southwark on the banks of the River Thames, the remarkable changes witnessed and the diverse lives of those who have lived there.

== Reception ==
In The Guardian Kathryn Hughes wrote that what the book 'does brilliantly is to use the narrative of Bankside in general and one house in particular to show how we tend to clothe the past in whatever psychic bits and pieces come immediately to hand'. In The Independent Christopher Fowler praised the book, writing describing it as 'This graceful discursive restores forgotten lives, and unlocks a door to reveal London in its glorious breadth and entirety'.
