= Snow lantern =

Garden decoration

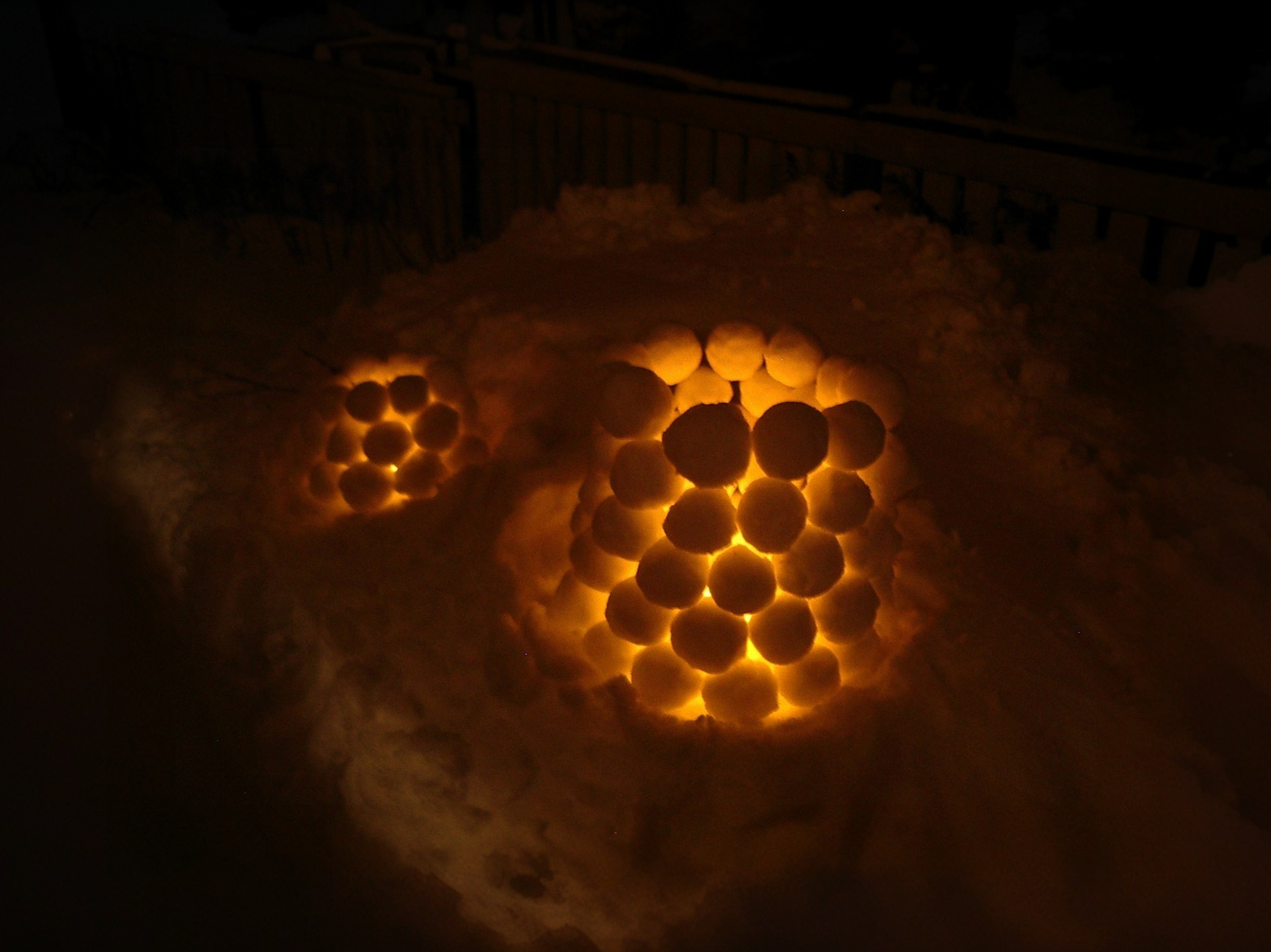
Snow lanterns

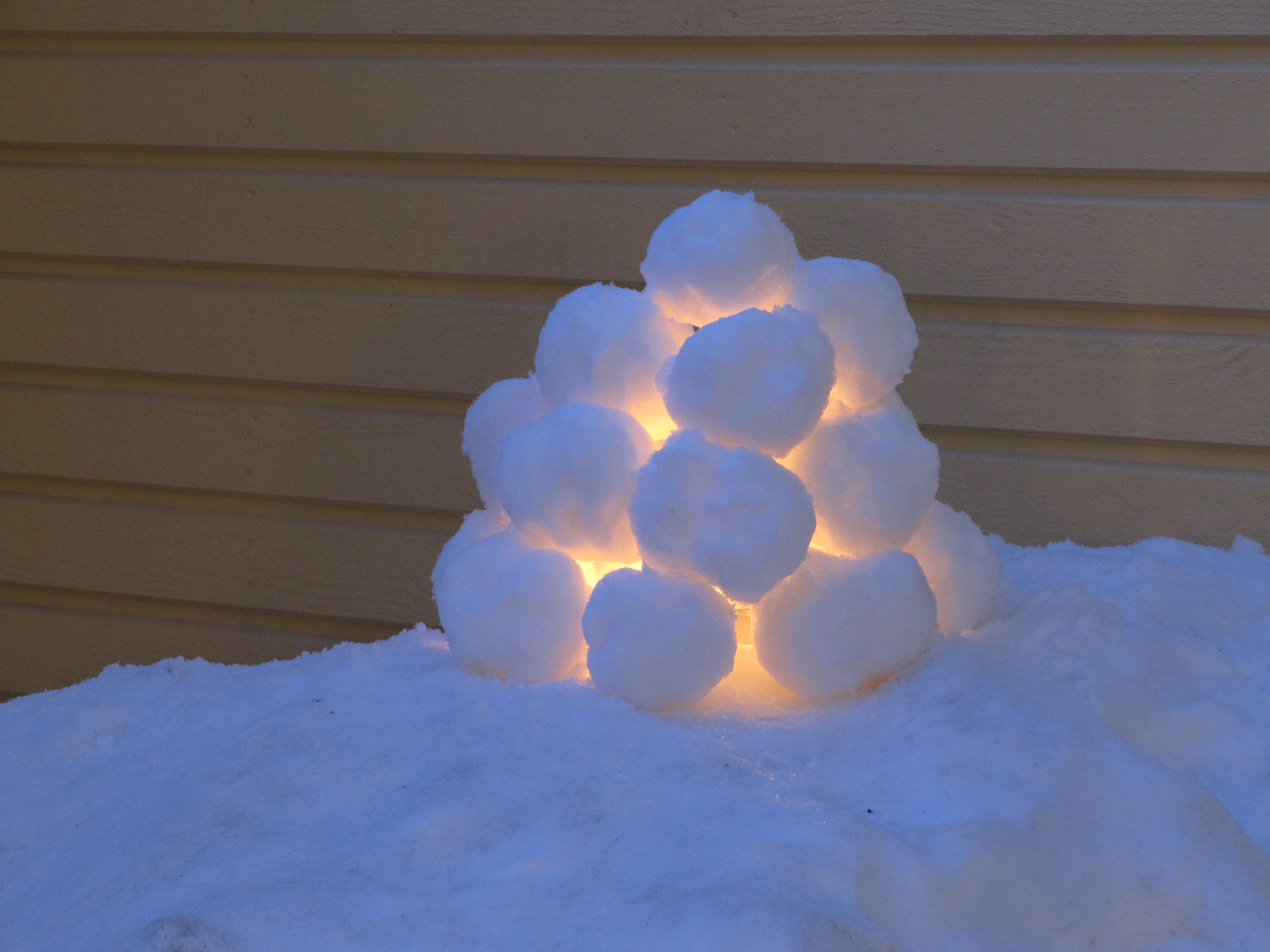
A snow lantern in Sweden

A snow lantern is a hollow cone built of snowballs into which a light is put, usually a candle or a Japanese stone garden lantern Yukimi Gata. People lighting their own snow lanterns is one of Sweden's, Finland's and Norway's Christmas traditions.

== Festival ==
Hirosaki in Aomori Prefecture, Japan holds an annual winter four-day Hirosaki Castle Snow Lantern festival at Hirosaki Castle. The festival had attracted 310,000 visitors in 1999 and included 165 standing snow lanterns and 300 mini snow caves.
