= Gillian Tindall =

British writer and historian (1938–2025)

Gillian Tindall FRSL
- Born: Gillian Elizabeth Tindall; 4 May 1938; Regent's Park, London, England
- Died: 1 October 2025 (aged 87); London, England
- Occupations: Novelist; biographer; historian

Gillian Elizabeth Tindall (4 May 1938 – 1 October 2025) was a British writer and historian. Among her books are City of Gold: The Biography of Bombay (1992) and Celestine: Voices from a French Village (1997). Her novel Fly Away Home won the Somerset Maugham Award in 1972. From the 1960s to the early 1990s, Tindall worked as a journalist, writing stories for The Guardian, the Evening Standard, The Times, and The Independent, and for many years was a regular guest on the BBC Radio 3 arts discussion programme, Critics' Forum.

== Early life ==
Tindall was born in Park Village East in Regent's Park on 4 May 1938, the daughter of Dennis Hamilton Tindall and Ursula Orange. Her mother was a novelist in the 1930s and 1940s. Tindall's maternal grandfather was Sir Hugh Orange, director general of education in India from 1902 to 1910, and then accountant-general of the Board of Education for England and Wales. Her great-grandfather was physician William Orange, second superintendent of Broadmoor Hospital. Dennis Tindall was a medical publisher, a partner with his father Albert Alfred Tindall (the younger) at Bailliere, Tindall & Cox from 1937. After her mother's death in 1955, her father married, secondly in 1956, Helen Florence Chalmers.

Tindall was educated at Manor House School in Limpsfield; she later wrote that she was unhappy at the school. She went on to Lady Margaret Hall, Oxford, where she graduated B.A. in 1959 with a first class in English.

== Works ==
Beginning as a writer of fiction, she made her initial move into non-fiction with a biography of the fin de siècle novelist George Gissing. She wrote books about Londoners as separate in time as Rosamond Lehmann, a novelist contemporary of the Bloomsbury Group, and Wenceslaus Hollar, a Czech etcher of the seventeenth century. Another of Tindall's works, The Journey of Martin Nadaud: A Life And Turbulent Times (1999), reconstructs the life and voyage of a 19th-century Frenchman from the Limousin region – a master stonemason-builder, who became a French political figure, revolutionary, republican Member of Parliament, and then an exile in England for eighteen years. Following this book's publication, Tindall was awarded in France the title of Chevalier of the Order of Arts and Letters.

Isabelle Priest, writing in RIBAJ, said that Tindall specialised in the genre of "miniaturist history". Tindall's book The Fields Beneath (1977) explores the history of the London neighbourhood of Kentish Town and the spread of great cities in general, and is regarded as a seminal work of urban historical geography.

Tindall's book The House by the Thames (2006) is about the house built at 49 Bankside in London in 1710 and the buildings that preceded it on the site. The house, which still stands in the shadow of the Globe Theatre, has served as a home for prosperous coal merchants, an office, a lodging house, and once again as a private residence in the later 20th century. It has been erroneously assumed to be where Sir Christopher Wren lived during the construction of St Paul's Cathedral; other fantasy residents of older buildings on the site include Catherine of Aragon and William Shakespeare.

Later books by Tindall include Footprints in Paris: a Few Streets, a Few Lives (2009), which deals with the author's ancestors and their various connections to Paris over the generations. In Three Houses, Many Lives (2012) she included autobiographical material about the Manor House School, adding to the building's history. She felt "sickening dread" passing the building as an adult; "it figured in incidental ways in the novels and short stories that I wrote".

The Tunnel Through Time: A New Route For An Old London Journey (2016), which explores the layers of history that lie beneath the route of London's newest underground railway, the Elizabeth line; and The Pulse Glass and the Beat of Other Hearts (2019), a reflection on the links that exist between valued objects and human memories. Her final work, Journal of a Man Unknown (2025), is a novel written from the viewpoint of a Huguenot iron worker which explores history as comprising the lives of working people. It was published posthumously by the publishing imprint of the blog Spitalfields Life, for which she had been a contributing writer.

== Death ==
Tindall died in London on 1 October 2025, at the age of 87.

== Bibliography ==
=== Novels ===
- No Name in the Street (1959, Cassell & Co, ASIN B0000CKDE1)
- The Water and the Sound (1961, Cassell & Co, ASIN B002G3FW5W)
- The Edge of the Paper (1963, Cassell & Co, ASIN B0031JPUCK)
- The Youngest (1967, Secker & Warburg, ASIN B001AIVBTA)
- Someone Else (1969, Walker & Company, ISBN 0340107103)
- Fly Away Home (1971, Hodder & Stoughton, ISBN 0340150394)
- The Traveller and His Child (1975, Hodder & Stoughton, ISBN 0340197412)
- The Intruder (1979, Hodder & Stoughton, ISBN 0340243961)
- Looking Forward (1983, Hodder & Stoughton, ISBN 0340345063)
- To the City (1987, Hutchinson & Co, ISBN 0091705401)
- Give Them All My Love (1989, Hutchinson & Co, ISBN 0091739195)
- Spirit Weddings (1992, Hutchinson & Co, ISBN 0091745055)
- Journal of a Man Unknown (2024, Spitalfields Life Books, ISBN 0995740194)

=== Short stories ===
- Dances of Death: Short Stories on a Theme (1973, Walker & Company, ISBN 0802704263)
- The China Egg and Other Stories (1981, Hodder & Stoughton, ISBN 0340259701)
- Journey of a Lifetime and Other Stories (1990, Hutchinson & Co, ISBN 0091744504)

=== Biography ===
- The Born Exile: George Gissing (1974, Temple Smith, ISBN 085117051X)

=== Non-fiction ===
- A Handbook on Witches (1965, Castle Books, ASIN B000JG9ESE)
- Rosamond Lehmann: An Appreciation (1985, Chatto & Windus, ISBN 978-0701127060)
- Countries of the Mind: The Meaning of Place to Writers (New edition 2011, Faber & Faber, ISBN 978-0571260362)
- City of Gold: The Biography of Bombay (1992, Penguin Books Ltd. Travel Library, ISBN 978-0140095005)
- Célestine: Voices from a French Village (1995, Sinclair-Stevenson; 1997, Henry Holt & Co., ISBN 978-0805051773)
- The Journey of Martin Nadaud: A Life and Turbulent Times (1999, St Martin's Press, ISBN 978-0312261856)
- The Man Who Drew London: Wenceslaus Hollar in Reality and Imagination (2002, Chatto & Windus, ISBN 0-7011-6968-0)
- The House by the Thames: And the People Who Lived There (2006, Pimlico, ISBN 978-1844130948)
- Footprints in Paris: A Few Streets, a Few Lives (2009, Chatto & Windus, ISBN 978-0701181024)
- The Fields Beneath (1977) (New edition 2011, Eland Press, ISBN 978-1906011482)
- Three Houses, Many Lives (2012, Chatto & Windus, ISBN 978-0701185183)
- The Tunnel Through Time: A New Route for an Old London Journey (2016, Chatto & Windus, ISBN 978-0701188658)
- The Pulse Glass and the Beat of Other Hearts (2019, Chatto & Windus, ISBN 978-1784742997)
