= Ursula Orange =

British novelist (1909–1955)

- Born: Ursula Marguerite Dorothea Orange; 1909
- Died: 1955 (aged 46)
- Occupation: Novelist

Ursula Orange (1909–1955) was a mid-20th-century British novelist who is known for focusing her books on the domestic lives and career aspirations of young women.

== Biography ==
She was born Ursula Marguerite Dorothea Orange in Shimla in 1909. Her father was Sir Hugh Orange, director general of education in India from 1902 to 1910, and then accountant-general of the Board of Education for England and Wales. Her paternal grandfather was physician William Orange, second superintendent of Broadmoor Hospital.

In 1934, Orange married Dennis Tindall, whom she had met when studying at Lady Margaret Hall, Oxford. The couple had a daughter, the writer Gillian Tindall, and a son. She was for a time the assistant secretary for the British Poetry Society. According to her daughter, who wrote about her in the autobiographical 2009 book Footprints in Paris, her death in 1955 at the age of 46 was by suicide.

== Books ==
Orange wrote a total of six novels, which have been called "unjustly forgotten". She wrote in a lightly comic vein that concealed serious intentions, and her style has been referred to as "the Angela Thirkell school at its best." Her protagonists tended to be young women of middle-class upbringing who were grappling with the challenges of jobs, children, and romantic entanglements. For example, her first novel, Begin Again (1936), is about several young women who are dissatisfied with their lives in various ways—some are tired of their London jobs while others long to leave the country for London or to have exciting affairs. Of this book, one critic remarked that the women are deftly drawn with a light comic touch but the male characters are somewhat dimmer.

Tom Tiddler's Ground (1941), Orange's third novel, unfolds during World War II, giving a dark undercurrent to the surface comedy. Set in an English village in the early days of the war, the story features a comic cast ranging from war evacuees to shady businessmen, all entangled in odd schemes and domestic complications of various sorts. The key characters are two women of quite different characters. Caroline Cameron is witty and charming but not altogether likeable; bored with her spoiled daughter and her smothering husband, she is ready to strike out on her own. Constance Smith, on the other hand, is kind-hearted and sociable but suffers from a disastrous marriage. The pleasure of the novel lies partly in the way all the complications are worked out by the end. It was published in America by Morrow under the title Ask Me No Questions.

To Sea in a Sieve (1937) is about a rebellious young woman who gets involved in radical movements and is torn between two men. Company in the Evening (1944) is about a young mother who works in a literary agency. Have Your Cake (1942) and Portrait of Adrian (1945) round out the six.
