= Snow roller =

Large snowball formed by wind action

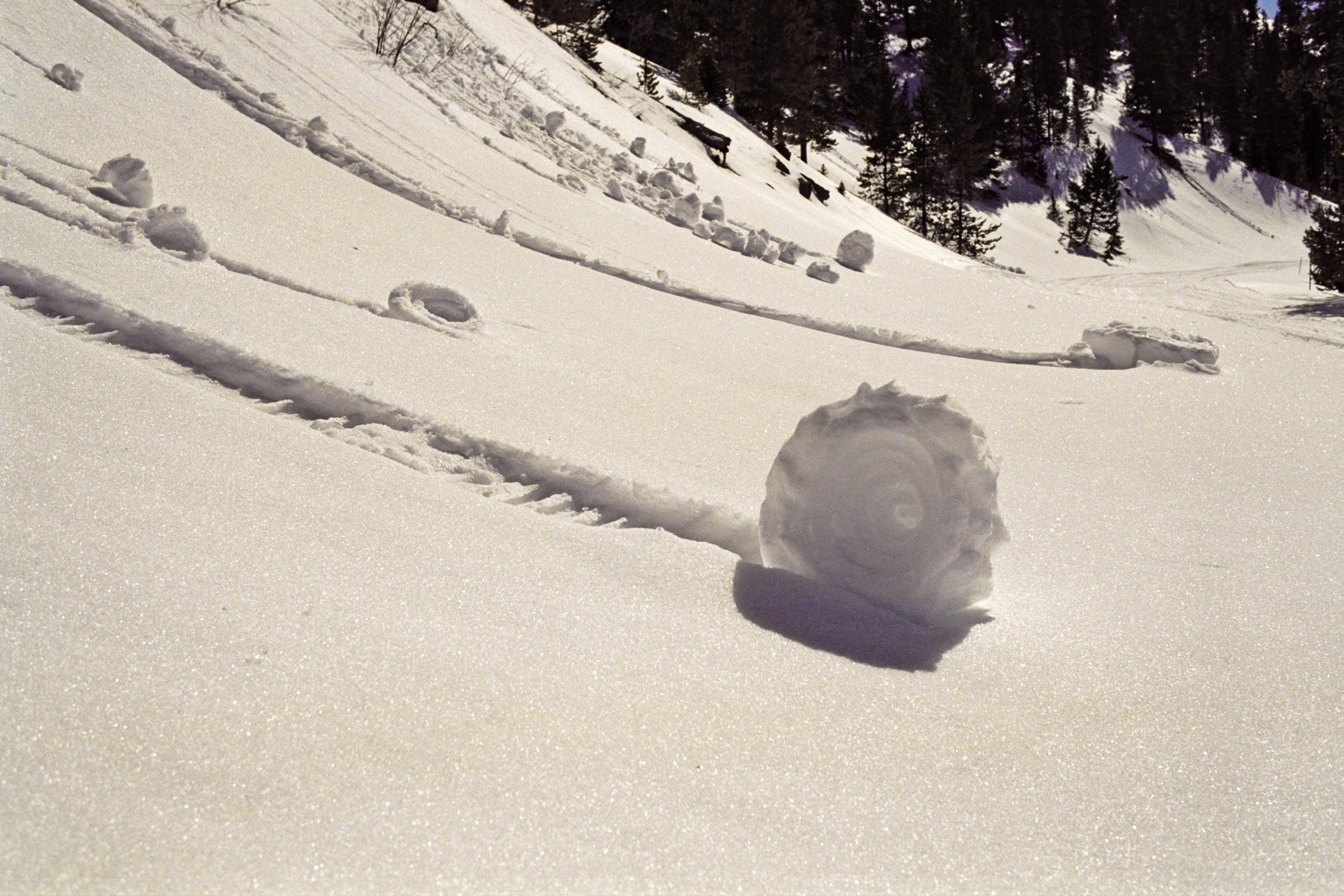
Snow roller in Rocky Mountain National Park

A snow roller is a rare meteorological phenomenon in which cylindrical snowballs are formed naturally as chunks of snow roll down hill or are blown along the ground by wind, picking up further snow along the way, in much the same way that the large snowballs used in snowmen are made. They can be as small as a tennis ball, but they can also be bigger than a car. Most snow rollers are a few inches or centimeters wide.

Alternative names for snow rollers include: snow bales, snow donuts, snownuts and wind snowballs. Unlike snowballs made by people, snow rollers are typically cylindrical in shape, and are often hollow since the inner layers, which are the first layers to form, are weak and thin compared to the outer layers. The inner sections can easily be blown away, leaving what looks like a doughnut or Swiss roll.

Several conditions are needed for snow rollers to form:

- There must be a relatively thin surface layer of wet, loose snow, with a temperature near the melting point of ice.
- Under this thin layer of wet snow there must be a substrate to which the thin surface layer of wet snow will not stick, such as ice or powder snow.
- The wind must be strong enough to move the snow rollers, but not strong enough to blow them apart.
- Alternatively, gravity can move the snow rollers as when a snowball, such as those that will fall from a tree or cliff, lands on a steep hill and begins to roll down the hill.

Because of this last condition, snow rollers are more common in hilly areas. However, the precise nature of the conditions required makes them a very rare phenomenon.

== Gallery ==
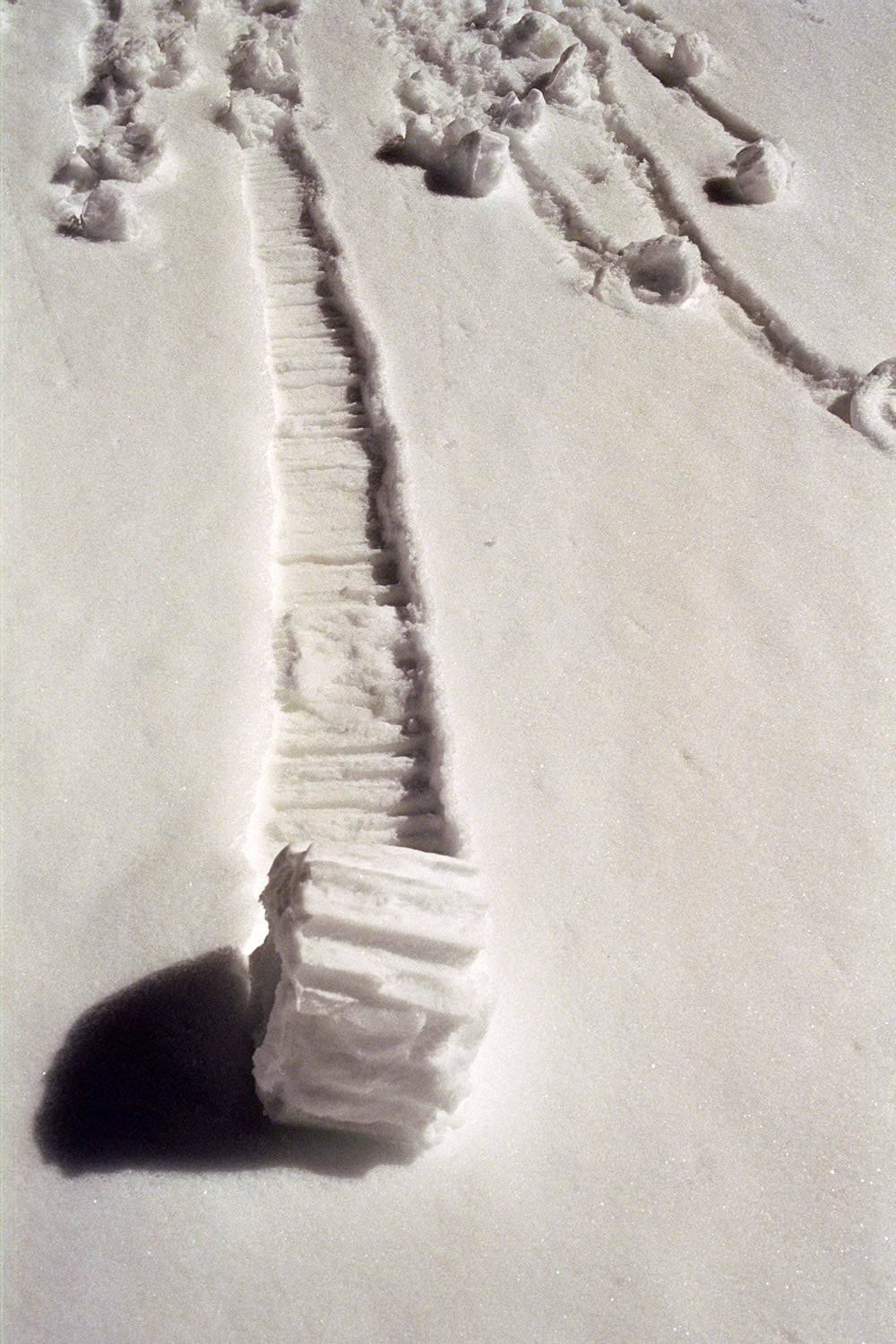
Snow roller with a gear-like shape from Rocky Mountain National Park, Colorado

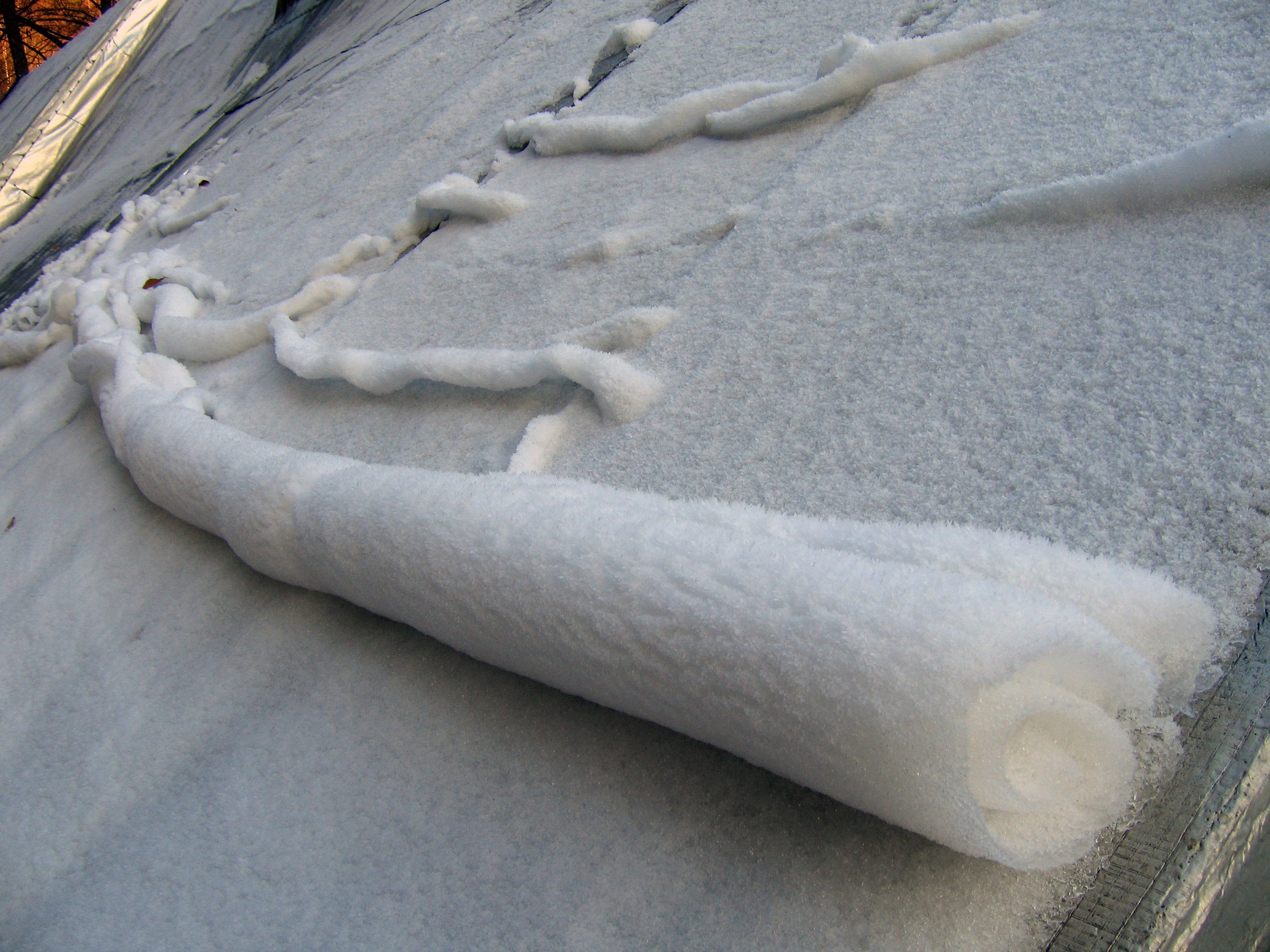
Snow roller in the Giant Mountains, in the Czech Republic near Poland

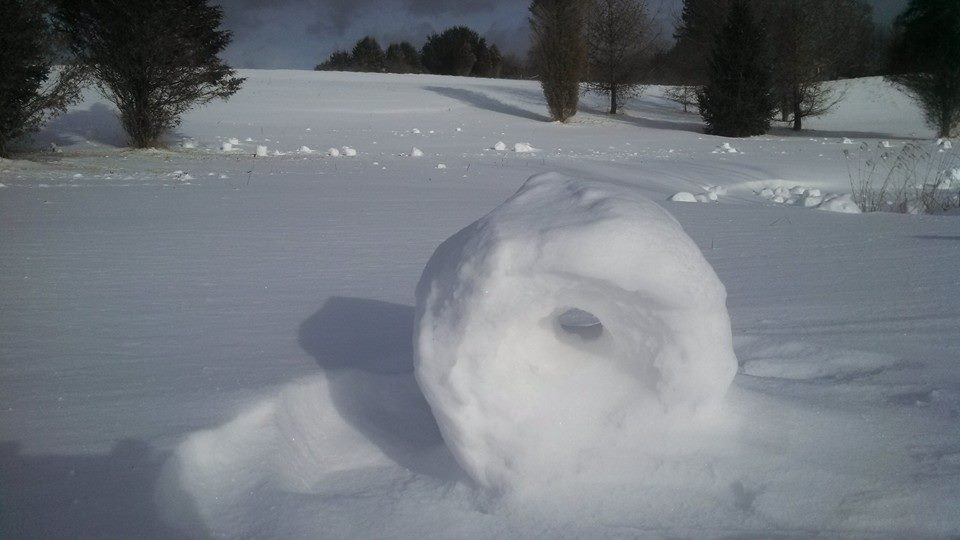
Snow rollers formed overnight during high winds in Venus, Pennsylvania

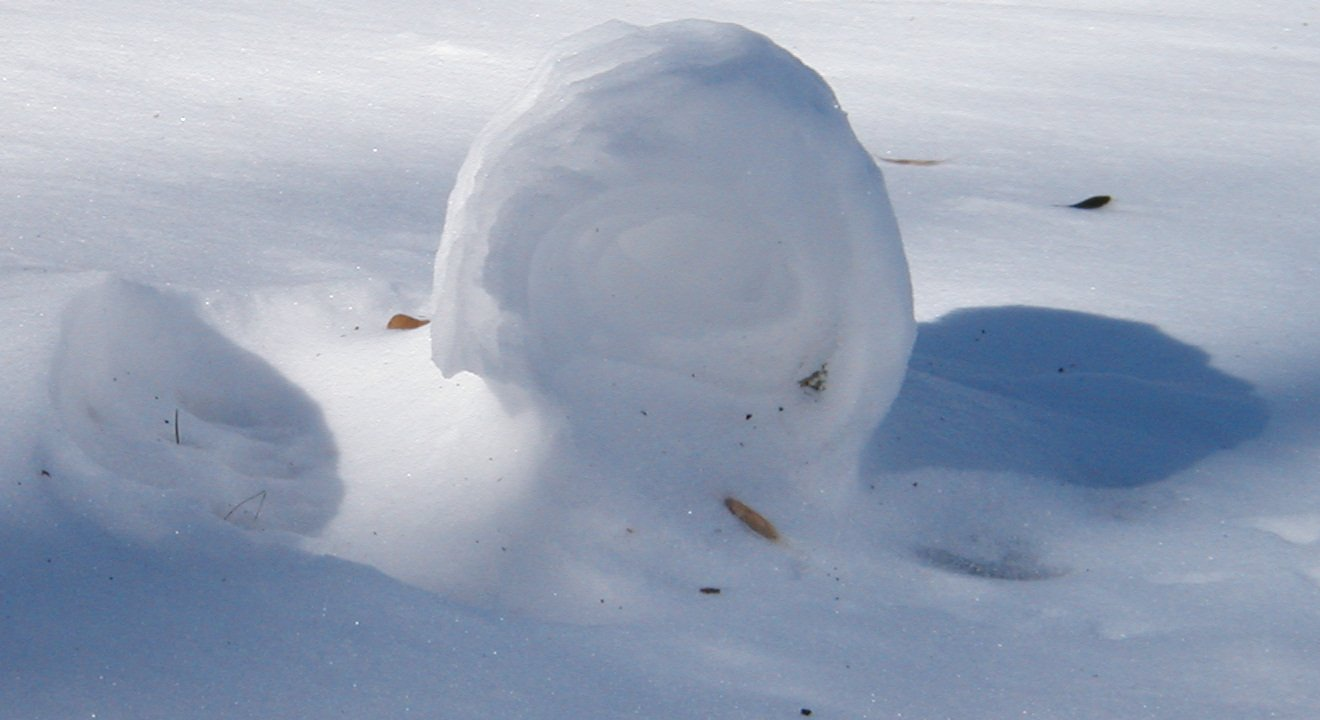
A snow roller in Cincinnati, Ohio, United States

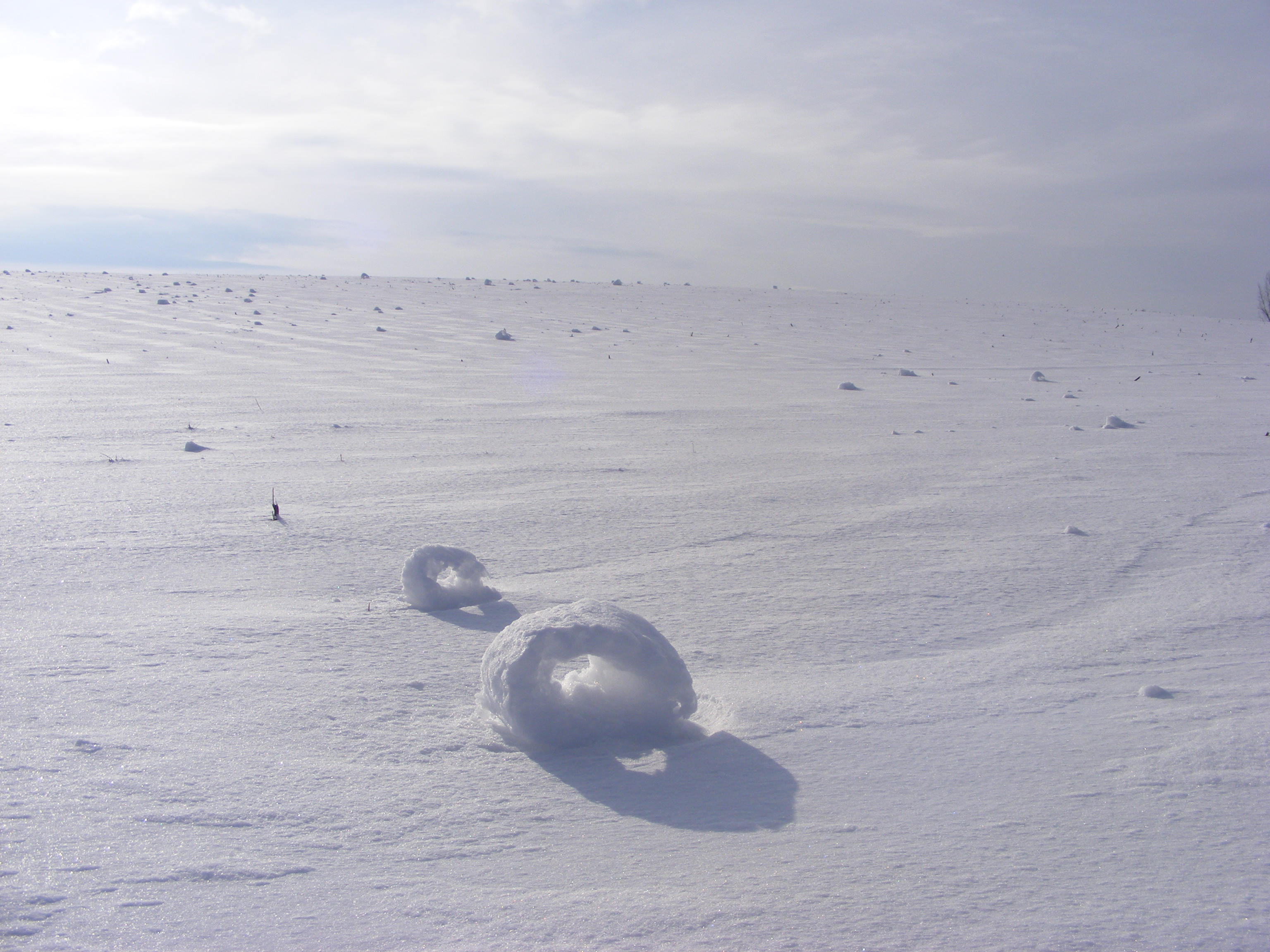
Snow rollers leaving tracks in the snow

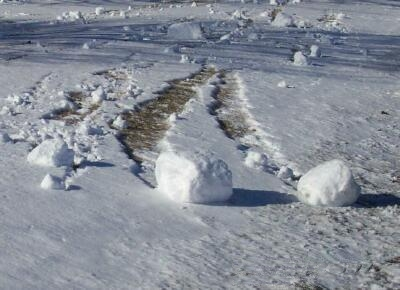
Snow rollers at Lincoln Christian College, Illinois

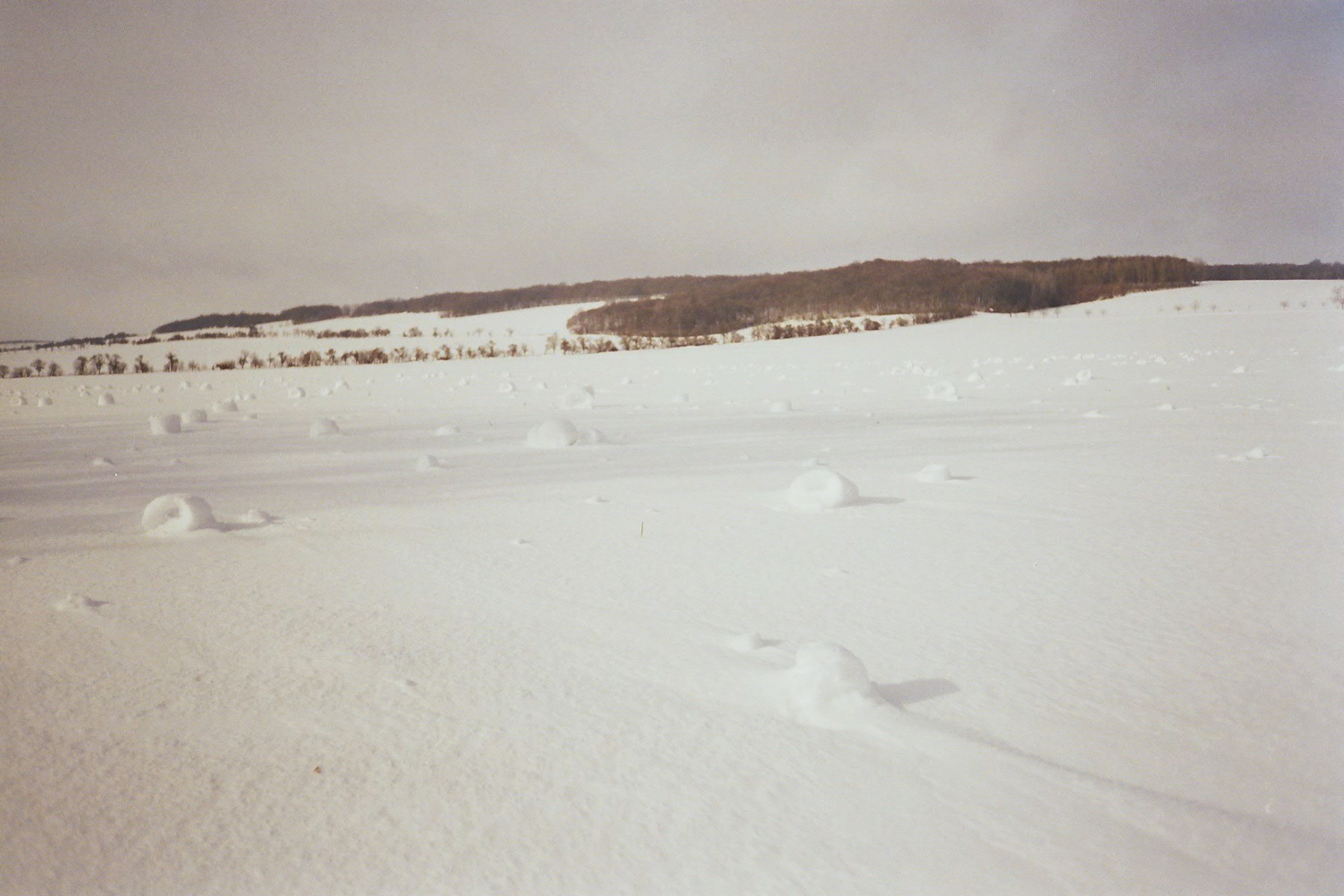
Snow rollers in Saxony-Anhalt, Germany

== See also ==
- Yukimarimo – Balls of fine frost formed in Antarctica
