= V. H. Drummond =

British children's author and illustrator (1911–2000)

Violet Hilda Drummond (30 July 1911 – 7 February 2000) was a British children's author and illustrator from the 1930s to 1970s. During her career, Drummond primarily wrote series on Mrs. Easter, Little Laura and Miss Anna Tully. Of her works, Drummond was awarded the 1954 Kate Greenaway Medal for Mrs Easter and the Storks. During the 1960s, her Little Laura books were adapted into eighteen television films for the Children's Hour on BBC. Apart from writing, Drummond was an illustrator for various authors including Helen Cresswell, Barbara Sleigh and J.K. Stanford. Drummond was also a watercolour painter and had her artwork shown in London, England.

== Early life and education ==
On 30 July 1911, Drummond was born in London. Her father, Robert Drummond, was a banker who was killed in action in 1914 during World War I. Her mother, Hilda Margaret Harris subsequently remarried, taking the surname Gunning. As a child, Drummond began her drawing experience doodling in her school notebooks. Growing up, Drummond attended the Links School in Eastbourne and then a finishing school in Paris. For her art education, Drummond attended Saint Martin's School of Art from 1939 to 1942. During this time period, Drummond was a member of the First Aid Nursing Yeomanry for the British Army.

== Career ==
As a children's author, Drummond wrote Phewtus the Squirrel in 1939 based on a toy squirrel named Rufus that her son mispronounced as Phewtus. From the 1940s to 1970s, Drummond primarily wrote fictional series comprising five books each on Mrs. Easter and Little Laura. While writing two books on Miss Anna Truly, Drummond also provided the illustrations for each of her fictional books. Of her works, Drummond received the 1957 Kate Greenaway Medal for Mrs Easter and the Storks. For the BBC, Drummond's Little Laura series was adapted into eighteen animated television films. For the BBC adaption, Drummond wrote, illustrated and produced the Little Laura episodes that aired on the Children's Hour from 1963 to 1964.

Apart from writing, Drummond illustrated works for various other authors from the 1940s to the 1960s. These authors included J.K. Stanford, Barbara Sleigh, Helen Cresswell and others. Alongside her literary career, Drummond started painting in the 1950s. With her watercolour paintings and lithographs, Drummond had works shown at the Fortescue Swann Gallery plus the Chenil and the Upper Grosvenor Galleries in London. She was an elected member of the Society of Industrial Artists. Apart from art, Drummond started a self-named productions company in 1960 as chairperson. Drummond was married and had one child before her death on 7 February 2000 in Essex.

== Books illustrated by Drummond ==
- The Twelfth, 1944, by J.K. Stanford
- Here and There, a Lusty Trout, 1947, by Thomas A. Powell
- Verse and Worse, 1952, by Arnold Silcock
- The Title's My Own, 1952, by G. Bles
- The Shaggy Dog Story, 1953, by E. Partridge
- Wild Little Horse, 1955, by E. Dillon
- Carbonel King of the Cats, 1955, by B. Sleigh
- The Kingdom of the Winds, 1957, by Angela Jean
- Espit de Corps, 1957, by Lawrence Durrell
- Lisa and the Helicopter, 1958, by B. Ireson
- The Piemakers, 1967, by Helen Cresswell
- The Quest of the Catnip Mouse, 1967, by A. Miller.

== Books written by Drummond ==
- Phewtus the Squirrel, 1939
- Mrs. Easter's Parasol, 1944
- Miss Anna Truly, 1945
- Lady Talavera, 1946
- The Charming Taxicab, 1947
- The Mountain that Laughed, 1947
- Tiggie's Innings, 1947
- The Flying Postman, 1948
- Mrs. Finch's Per Shop, 1953
- Mrs. Easter and the Storks, 1957
- Little Laura on the River, 1960
- Little Laura's Cat, 1960
- Little Laura and Her Best Friend, 1963
- Little Laura and the Thief, 1963
- Miss Anna Truly and the Christmas Lights, 1968
- Mrs. Easter and the Golden Bounder, 1970
- Mrs. Easter's Christmas Flight, 1972
- I'll Never Be Asked Again, 1979.
