= No One Must Know =

1962 children's novel by Barbara Sleigh

First edition (UK)

No One Must Know is a 1962 children's novel by the English writer Barbara Sleigh. The story concerns a small group of children living in English town, sandwiched between a railway and a warehouse, in a row of rented, white-painted terraced houses, where the landlord will allow no pets.

== Story line ==
The story begins with the arrival of new tenants at Number Six, an end-house in Cumberland Place, which is a poky town-centre street sandwiched between a railway and a warehouse. The incoming family consists of a little girl, Jenny Hawthorn, and her father (she has lost her mother in a car crash), and a cat named Thomas (p. 14). The girl's face is described as "sprinkled with freckles – as freely as an apple charlotte is with brown sugar." The pet problem is one that she manages to share immediately with other children in the street: "'Is it true? ... No pets?'" Barty nodded. 'I say, whatever shall I do?'" (p. 11).

The problem has been compounded overnight, when Thomas turns out to be a female cat and gives birth to four kittens. Jenny and two of her new neighbours, Barty Fergus and Molly Dudgeon, find a secret place for them on a piece of waste land, which they call Tom Tiddler's Ground. This is out of sight of the landlord, nicknamed Old Cockles after this surname Mussels: "I won't have it. Insanitary, do you hear?" (p. 13). Three other children from the Place – Sam, Midge and Molly's younger brother Tony – are brought into the secret.

The story then delves into several further problems: a spy among the children (p. 67 ff.), train-spotters who frequent the path behind the houses (p. 79 ff.), a delinquent youth who uses the waste ground to store goods he has stolen (p. 110 ff.), and the prospect of the houses themselves being demolished.

A detailed map of the area is provided (pp. 184–185).

== Editions ==
The UK first edition by Collins of 1962 was followed by a US edition by Bobbs-Merrill in the following year and by a further UK reprint in Collins's revived Evergreen Library in 1968. The book appeared in a Dutch translation in 1963 and a German translation in 1974.

The book was intended for children of about ten and upwards. It is not currently in print.

== TV series ==
The book became the basis of a Jackanory BBC children's television series of five 15-minute parts in 1969, directed and adapted by Jeremy Swan. The narrator was Robert Swann and the part of Jenny was played by Lorraine Windsor.
