= Snowball (novel) =

Novel by Abdel Rahim Jeeran

- First edition
- Author: Abdul Rahim Jeeran
- Language: Arabic
- Publisher: Dar Al-Adab, Beirut
- Publication date: 2013
- Publication place: Morocco

Snowball (Arabic: كرة الثلج) is the second novel by the Moroccan writer Abdel Rahim Jeeran, in this book the writer approaches the Moroccan reality and gambles the younger generations with a different narrative strategy. The hero of the story is in the hospital after a coma continued to one month. And he was told at the time that caused of this coma is because of a car accident, and the situation of the paralysis that resulted from the accident cannot be resolved, then the novel goes back to past. And through it, the mother which is the second character in the novel. The last period, with all its details, men, women and youth, all goes into describing the tragedies that befell her family, and it was the reason why her son was in the hospitalized. The novel moves between the sixties in Maghreb, and with all its political and social manifestations, and between the writer's eras of the twenty-first century.

== Narration ==
The novel events in the first part of the mother are told by a "Woman of the common people" (Original title: Aimra’ah min aleawam), she is the main character, as for the hero of the second and final part, it was her son “Sadiq”, who takes over the narration process, relying as a third speaker, and addressing directly to the reader. The speech takes a dialogue pattern with the reader, he presents solutions that justify them, and justify their logic, trying to convince those he addresses.

In the second part, the same narrative pattern continues in this part too, the narrator changes from mother to son. The narrator, in this delusion, with his appearance and clarity. He is tempted by the artistic game, so he thinks that he does not read. You put him under the illusion of "listening" to the hadith of the hero/narrator. Within the framework of the artistic game, the reader is led to the hero's position, as the latter deludes him that he is interviewing him from a peer position, and that he is not governed by the position of the "hidden writer" or the "implicit narrator.”

=== Part two ===
There is a lot of anxiety in this novel, and the accountability of parents and society. The narration opens towards a living, cultural expression, so that each of the two characters appears to be the same. But it differs from each of them point of view: the view of the world, the people in it, their difference and the diversity of their voices. It becomes clear to the reader that the mother has lost her mind and is living in a state of dementia. Everything that happened on her tongue, mentioning events and personalities, is a pure “myth” that rejected the world she lives in, and replaced it with another, worse. You changed the name of the place you live in. She buried her husband, weak in character. She replaced herself with her single daughter, married her, and transferred the conflict between her husband and her brother to a conflict between her son and her daughter's husband, who did not marry according to the son's account, and her husband who did not die. The court case did not take place in the first place. The first part turns into nonsense, after we discover that the mother has died.
