= The Snowball (children's novel) =

1969 children's novel by Barbara Sleigh

1977 edition (publ. Hodder & Stoughton)

The Snowball (first published 1969) is a domestic fantasy novel for children by the English writer Barbara Sleigh (1906–1982), who is best known for her Carbonel series. The two main human characters are Tom Tickle, aged eight, and his sister Tilda, aged six.

== The story ==
The story is set in a small house on the edge of a small English country town. The children are on a loose rein, as their mother is soon called away to nurse some relations of theirs through a bout of measles, leaving them with their preoccupied father, a schoolmaster who is busy writing a book (p. 10). Snow starts to fall almost immediately after Mrs Tickle leaves. The children spend the day making a snowman – Tom's work – and a snow-woman – Tilda's work with a little help from Tom (p. 17 ff.)

The following day, the children are puzzled to find a large, smooth snowball between the snowman and snow-woman. They decide to store it in the fridge to show to their mother when she returns. But it is "no ordinary snowball", and three days later, it hatches into "a tiny little person, white from head to foot, with round, pudgy hands and feet like the paws of a teddy bear." When it shook itself "bits of ice flew in all directions" (p. 27). The story of raising the "snow baby" secretly (p. 31 ff.), how he learns to talk, how "touchy" he becomes, and how he outgrows the refrigerator is amusingly told in plain English, which makes the story suitable for children as young as eight. They decide to call the snow baby Flump after the sound he makes when he sits down (p. 38).

There are cheerful black-and-white illustrations by Patricia Drew throughout the first edition. The dénouement involves the returning mother (p. 82 ff.), but the snow family then disappears along with the snow, and it turns out that the two children have caught measles as well (p. 88).

== Editions ==
The first, bound edition appeared from Brockhampton Press in 1969. The same illustrations were used for a 1979 Dutch translation. The second English edition in 1977 came from Hodder in hardcover and paperback, and the third and most recent was a paperback from the Hamlyn series Beaver Books in 1980, with illustrations by John Spiers.
