= David Davis (broadcaster) =

British radio executive and broadcaster

William Eric Davis MBE (27 June 1908 – 29 April 1996), better known by his professional name David Davis, was a British radio executive and broadcaster (voice actor or storyteller). He was the head of the BBC Children's Hour.

== Story-telling ==
Born in Malvern, Worcestershire and educated at Queen's College, Oxford, Davis began a teaching career at Dunchurch Hall Preparatory School, but soon moved on to Bembridge School on the Isle of Wight. He then applied successfully for a job at the BBC advertised in The Listener, and joined Children's Hour at the beginning of 1935 as a staff accompanist, but it was soon found that he had the ideal voice for radio story-telling. In the years that followed, he recorded many stories including Anna Sewell's Black Beauty, Kenneth Grahame's The Wind in the Willows, J.R.R. Tolkien's The Hobbit and Rudyard Kipling's Just So Stories.

In 1961, Davis was appointed head of children's sound broadcasting at the BBC, but by that time children were deserting radio for television and the separate children's radio department closed in 1964.

== Personal life ==
On 28 December 1935, Davis married Barbara Grace de Riemer Sleigh (1906–1982) at St. Peter's Church, Dunchurch. She was the daughter of the artist Bernard Sleigh and niece of John de Riemer Phillp, joint proprietor of Dunchurch Hall, where Davis had taught. Barbara Sleigh was employed by Children's Hour at the time, and she resigned according to BBC policy against married couples working in the same department. She continued to work for radio as a freelance writer and became a well-known writer of children's fiction.

== External resource ==
- Davis reading a passage from "The Wind in the Willows" in 1950
- David Davis at the Library of Congress, with 2 library catalogue records
