= Barbara Sleigh =

British children's writer and broadcaster 1906–1982

Barbara Grace de Riemer Sleigh (1906–1982) was an English children's writer and broadcaster. She is remembered most for her Carbonel series about a king of cats.

== Family and career ==
Barbara Sleigh was born on 9 January 1906 in Birmingham, the daughter of an artist, Bernard Sleigh, and his wife Stella, née Phillp, who had married in 1901. Both parents came from a Methodist background, but she was brought up an Anglican. The family moved to Chesham for a time, then back to Birmingham. Their marriage broke up in about 1914. Her older brother, Brocas Linwood Sleigh (1902–1965), would also become a writer.

Having attended art college and teachers' training college, Sleigh taught in various schools before joining the teacher training department at Goldsmiths College in London in 1929. She went to work for the BBC programme Children's Hour in 1932. There, in 1935, she married a colleague, David Davis (1908–1996) at Dunchurch, Warwickshire, but BBC house rules at the time would not allow husbands and wives to work in the same department. She therefore resigned and turned to freelance writing, film criticism and broadcasting. She and Davis had one son and two daughters.

Barbara Sleigh died in 1982.

== Writings ==
Sleigh's best-known novels for children are the three in the Carbonel series (1955–1978), about a king of cats. These Carbonel books are still in print. Also centred on cats, but for a slightly older age group, is her 1962 novel No One Must Know, a realistic story of a group of neighbouring children attempting to evade a landlord's ban on pets. The Snowball (1969) is a fantasy, in which the snowball turns into a snow-child, causing some fun and chaos in the family.

The other writings by Sleigh include novels for older children, notably Jessamy, a realistic 1967 time-slip novel; collections of stories; large amounts of radio adaptation; several picture books for younger children; and some educational readers. Several of her books came out in Puffin, the Penguin imprint; she wrote an article in 1967 for the first number of the house magazine Puffin Post. Sleigh was included in Uncle Mac's Children's Hour Book (Purnell, [c. 1950]), in the 1974 children's anthology of stories and poems Happy Families, edited by Barbara Willard, and in the Puffin Annual (1974), edited by Kaye Webb and others. Her final work was as the editor of an anthology of stories about witches: Broomsticks and Beasticles (1981).

== Bibliography ==
=== Children's novels ===
- Carbonel (Carbonel series 1, 1955; translations: Danish 1957; Finnish 1957; German 1963; Dutch; Italian; Swedish; Turkish; Thai)
- The Patchwork Quilt (novel, 1956)
- The Kingdom of Carbonel (Carbonel series 2, 1959; translations: Finnish 1961; Dutch 1975; Italian)
- No One Must Know (novel, 1962; German translation 1974)
- Jessamy (novel, 1967; translations: Swedish 1968; Norwegian 1969; German 1980)
- The Snowball (novel, 1969; Dutch translation 1979)
- Grimblegraw and the Wuthering Witch (novel, 1978; Dutch translation 1980)
- Carbonel and Calidor (Carbonel series 3, 1978; Dutch translation 1979)

=== Short stories and folk tales ===
- The Singing Wreath, and Other Stories (1957)
- North of Nowhere: Stories and Legends from Many Lands Retold (1964)
- Stirabout Stories: West of Widdershins (1971)
- Spin Straw to Gold (fairy tales and legends, 1974)
- Funny Peculiar (anthology of stories, 1975)
- Winged Magic (folk tales, 1979)
- Five (stories, 1979)
- Broomsticks and Beasticles (anthology of stories and verse, 1981)

=== Picture storybooks ===
- Pen, Penny, Tuppence (picture storybook, 1968)
- Ninety-nine Dragons (picture storybook, 1974; translations: French 1975; German 1976; Dutch 1976; Afrikaans 1980)
- Charlie Chumbles (picture storybook, 1977)

=== Other ===
- Second Book of Hundreds of Things a Girl Can Make (non-fiction, 1949)
- The Seven Days, etc. (educational reader, 1958)
- The Smell of Privet (memoirs, 1971)
- A Treasury of Stories for Four Year Olds (1994)
- Mystery at Witchend: the Long Lost Radio Scripts (scripts of four-part radio adaptation of 1943 book by Malcolm Saville, 2008)
