= List of Royal Air Force Glider units =

This is a list of Royal Air Force glider units.

== Gliding Schools ==
=== 1-100 ===
data
Name	Formed	Formed at	Aircraft	Airfields also used	Disbanded at	Disbanded	Fate
1 Gliding School	December 1942	RAF Strathaven	Slingsby Cadet TX.1; Slingsby Sedbergh TX.1	RAF Dungavel	RAF Dumfries	1 September 1955	Reformed as 661 Gliding School
2 Gliding School	25 October 1942	RAF East Fortune	Unknown	RAF Connel	RAF Dumfries	January 1946	Reformed as 2 Gliding School
2 Gliding School	1 November 1947	RAF Grangemouth	Falcon IV; Grunau Baby; Cadet TX.1/TX.2; Sedbergh TX.3	n/a	RAF Grangemouth	1 September 1955	Disbanded
3 Gliding School	March 1944	RAF Macmerry	Cadet TX.1/TX.2	n/a	RAF Drem	1 September 1947	Disbanded
4 Gliding School	December 1943	RAF Paisley	Cadet TX.1/TX.2; Sedbergh TX.1	RAF Abbotsinch	RAF Grangemouth	1952	
5 Gliding School	October 1944	RAF Fordoun	Cadet TX.1/TX.2/TX.3; Prefect TX.1; Sedbergh TX.1	RAF Dyce	RAF Edzell	1 September 1955	662 Gliding School
6 Gliding School	January 1945	RAF Grangemouth	Cadet TX.1/TX.2; Grunau Baby IIB; Sedbergh TX.1	RAF Turnhouse	RAF Grangemouth	Late 1955	
7 Gliding School	March 1946	RAF Dalcross	Cadet TX.1/TX.2/TX.3; Sedbergh TX.1	n/a	RAF Dalcross	1 September 1955	Disbanded
8 Gliding School	May 1944	RAF Ayr	Cadet TX.1/TX.2	n/a	RAF Creetown	1947	Disbanded
9 Gliding School	June 1945	RAF Errol	Kite; Cadet TX.1	n/a	RAF Scone	December 1946	Disbanded
10 Gliding School	25 May 1945	RAF Turnberry	Cadet TX.1	Unknown	Unknown	Unknown	Disbanded
21 Gliding School	July 1943	RAF Lambton Park	Cadet TX.1	n/a	RAF Lambton Park	1946	Disbanded
22 Gliding School	June 1942	RAF Kirbymoorside	Cadet TX.1/TX.2/TX.3; Sedbergh TX.1	Det: RAF Waltham	RAF Church Fenton	15 May 1950	Reformed as 22 Gliding School
22 Gliding School	1950	RAF Waltham	Sedbergh TX.1	n/a	RAF Kirton-in-Lindsey	1 September 1955	643 Gliding School
23 Gliding School	May 1943	RAF Yeadon	Cadet TX.1/TX.2/TX.3; Sedbergh TX.1	n/a	RAF Rufforth	1 September 1955	642 Gliding School
24 Gliding School	September 1943	RAF Netherthorpe	Cadet TX.1/TX.2/TX.3; Sedbergh TX.1	RAF Firbeck; RAF Doncaster	RAF Lindholme	1 September 1955	Disbanded
25 Gliding School	September 1943	RAF Hedon	Cadet TX.1	n/a	RAF Leconfield	Late 1947	Disbanded
26 Gliding School	October 1943	RAF Greatham	Cadet TX.1/TX.2/TX.3; Sedbergh TX.1	RAF Durham	RAF Middleton St George	Unknown	Reformed as 26 Gliding School
26 Gliding School	1 June 1948	RAF Middleton St George	Sedbergh TX.1	RAF Durham	RAF Middleton St George	1 September 1955	Disbanded
27 Gliding School	October 1943	RAF Woolsington	Cadet TX.1/TX.2/TX.3; Sedbergh TX.1	RAF Ouston	RAF Usworth	1 September 1955	Disbanded
28 Gliding School	January 1945	RAF Firbeck	Cadet TX.1/TX.2	RAF Middleton St George; Det: RAF Sutton Bank; RAF Topcliffe	RAF Linton-on-Ouse	1950	Disbanded
29 Gliding School	May 1944	RAF Sheffield	Cadet TX.1	RAF Askern; RAF Doncaster	RAF Spitalgate	1 September 1955	644 Gliding School
30 Gliding School	May 1944	RAF Sherburn-in-Elmet	Cadet TX.1	n/a	RAF Sherburn-in-Elmet	January 1946	Disbanded
31 Gliding School	April 1944	RAF Usworth	Cadet TX.1/TX.2/TX.3	n/a	RAF Usworth	1 September 1955	Disbanded into 641 Gliding School
41 Gliding School	July 1942	RAF Knowle	Cadet TX.1/TX.2/TX.3; Sedbergh TX.1	RAF Hockley Heath	RAF Honiley	April 1953	Disbanded
41 Gliding School	1 May 1954	RAF Pembrey	Unknown	n/a	RAF Pembrey	1 September 1955	Disbanded
42 Gliding School	October 1943	RAF Loughborough	Cadet TX.1/TX.2/TX.3; Sedbergh TX.1	RAF Bruntingthorpe; RAF Bramcote	RAF Cosford	1 September 1955	633 Gliding School
43 Gliding School	October 1943	Walsall Aerodrome	Cadet TX.1/TX.2/TX.3; Sedbergh TX.1	n/a	Walsall Aerodrome	December 1946	Reformed as 43 Gliding School
43 Gliding School	May 1947	RAF Lichfield	Cadet TX.1/TX.2/TX.3; Sedbergh TX.1	n/a	RAF Lichfield	1 September 1955	Disbanded
44 Gliding School	October 1943	Rearsby Aerodrome	Cadet TX.1	RAF Bruntingthorpe; RAF Desford	RAF Desford	1950	Reformed as 44 Gliding School
44 Gliding School	7 July 1951	RAF Cottesmore	Cadet II/TX.3; Sedbergh TX.1	n/a	RAF Spitalgate	1 September 1955	Disbanded
45 Gliding School	August 1942	RAF Meir	Cadet TX.1/TX.2/TX.3; Sedbergh TX.1; Prefect TX.1	Det: RAF Long Mynd	RAF Meir	1 September 1955	632 Gliding School
47 Gliding School	April 1945	RAF Camphill	Cadet TX.1/TX.2	n/a	RAF Hucknall	31 March 1948	Disbanded
48 Gliding School	October 1943	RAF Bretford (No. 46 SLG)	Cadet TX.1/TX.2/TX.3; Sedbergh TX.11	Castle Bromwich; Det: RAF Cosford	Castle Bromwich	November 1955	Disbanded
49 Gliding School	June 1945	RAF Burnaston	Cadet TX.1/TX.2/TX.3; Sedbergh TX.1	RAF Wymeswold; RAF Castle Donington	RAF Newton	1 September 1955	Disbanded
50 Gliding School	April 1944	RAF Lugg Meadows	Cadet TX.1/TX.2	Hereford Racecourse; RAF Madley	RAF Pershore	1 June 1948	Disbanded
51 Gliding School	-	RAF Long Mynd	Cadet TX.1	n/a	-		Probably became a detachment of 45 Gliding School
61 Gliding School	October 1943	RAF Abergavenny	Cadet TX.1	n/a	RAF Abergavenny	March 1946	Disbanded
62 Gliding School	October 1943	RAF Llanishen	Cadet TX.1	n/a	RAF Pengam Moors	4 August 1948	Disbanded
63 Gliding School	October 1943	RAF Tal-y-cafn	Cadet TX.1/TX.2	RAF Mona	RAF Valley	31 March 1948	Disbanded
64 Gliding School	May 1944	RAF Merthyr	Cadet TX.1	n/a	Unknown	1945	Disbanded
65 Gliding School	May 1944	RAF Rhoose	Kirby Cadet	n/a	Cardiff	March 1947	Disbanded
66 Gliding School	August 1944	Unknown	Unknown	Unknown	Unknown	June 1945	
67 Gliding School	August 1944	Unknown	Unknown	Unknown	Unknown	January 1946	
68 Gliding School	December 1944	RAF Bridgend	Cadet TX.1/TX.2/TX.3; Sedbergh TX.1	RAF Stormy Down	RAF St Athan	1 September 1955	634 Gliding School
69 Gliding School	October 1944	Unknown	Cadet TX.1	Unknown	Unknown	Unknown	
70 Gliding School	August 1944	RAF Pennard	Cadet TX.1/TX.2	n/a	RAF Fairwood Common	1947/48	Disbanded
72 Gliding School	June 1944	RAF Newport	Cadet TX.1	n/a	Unknown	1947	Disbanded
80 Gliding School	August 1951	Halesland Airfield	Cadet TX.3; Prefect TX.1	n/a	RAF Halesland	1 September 1955	Disbanded
81 Gliding School	October 1943	Yeovil Aerodrome	Cadet TX.1	n/a	RNAS Yeovilton	July 1948	Disbanded
82 Gliding School	October 1943	RAF Roborough	Cadet TX.1/TX.2/TX.3; Sedbergh TX.1; Prefect TX.1	Det: RAF St Merryn	RAF Harrowbeer	1 September 1955	Disbanded
83 Gliding School	May 1944	RAF Moreton Valence	Cadet TX.2/TX.3; Sedbergh TX.1	n/a	RAF Aston Down	September 1955	Disbanded
84 Gliding School	August 1944	Haldon Moor	Cadet TX.1/TX.2/TX.3; Sedbergh TX.1	n/a	RAF Exeter	1955	624 Gliding School
86 Gliding School	May 1944	Unknown	Cadet TX.1	Unknown	Unknown	Unknown	
87 Gliding School	July 1943	RAF Locking (non flying); Used RAF Weston-super-Mare	Cadet TX.2/TX.3; Sedbergh TX.1; Prefect TX.1	Det: RAF Halesland	RAF Locking	1 September 1955	621 Gliding School
88 Gliding School	July 1944	RAF Wroughton	Cadet TX.1	n/a	RAF Hullavington	May 1948	Disbanded
89 Gliding School	March 1944	RAF Christchurch	Cadet TX.1/TX.2/TX.3; Sedbergh TX.1	n/a	RAF Christchurch	1 September 1955	662 Gliding School
92 Gliding School	January 1944	RAF Yate	Cadet TX.2/TX.3; Sedbergh TX.1	RAF Charmy Down	RAF Colerne	1 September 1955	Disbanded
94 Gliding School	June 1945	RAF Yate	Cadet TX.1	n/a	RAF Yate	20 February 1948	Disbanded
95 Gliding School	April 1945	RAF Perranporth	Cadet TX.1	n/a	RAF St Eval	31 January 1950	Disbanded

=== 100-200 ===
data
Name	Formed	Formed at	Aircraft	Airfields also used	Disbanded at	Disbanded	Fate
101 Gliding School	7 August 1943	Great Yarmouth	Unknown	Unknown	Unknown	Unknown	Unknown
102 Gliding School	June 1943	Hethersett	Cadet TX.1/TX.3; Sedbergh TX.1	RAF Horsham St Faith	Swanton Morley	1 September 1955	611 Gliding School
103 Gliding School	October 1943	Westley	Cadet TX.1/TX.2	n/a	RAF Honington	25 April 1948	Disbanded
104 Gliding School	October 1944	Ipswich Airport	Cadet TX.1/TX.2/TX.3; Sedbergh TX.1	n/a	RAF Martlesham Heath	1 September 1955	612 Gliding School
105 Gliding School	May 1945	Cambridge	Cadet TX.1/TX.2/TX.3; Sedbergh TX.1	n/a	Cambridge	1 September 1955	Disbanded
106 Gliding School	June 1944	Henlow	Cadet TX.1/TX.2/TX.3; Sedbergh TX.1	n/a	Henlow	1 September 1955	Disbanded
107 Gliding School	September 1942	Lincoln	Cadet TX.1/TX.2	RAF Coleby Grange; Det: RAF Waltham	RAF Digby	October 1949	Disbanded
108 Gliding School	June 1945	Corby	Cadet TX.1	n/a	RAF Desborough	30 June 1949	Disbanded
121 Gliding School	August 1942	Wembley Stadium	Cadet TX.1	n/a	Halton	1945	Disbanded
122 Gliding School	October 1942	Northwick Park	Cadet TX.1/TX.2/TX.3; Sedbergh TX.1	Leavesden	RAF Halton	1 September 1955	613 Gliding School
123 Gliding School	October 1942	White Waltham	Cadet TX.1/TX.2/TX.3; Sedbergh TX.1; Prefect TX.1	Bray Court	RAF White Waltham	1 September 1955	623 Gliding School
124 Gliding School	August 1943	Elstree	Cadet TX.1/TX.2	n/a	Elstree	Unknown	Disbanded
125 Gliding School	August 1943	Denham	Cadet TX.1/TX.2/TX.3; Sedbergh TX.1	n/a	RAF Langley	1 September 1955	Disbanded
126 Gliding School	August 1943	Booker	Cadet TX.1/TX.2/TX.3; Sedbergh TX.1	n/a	Booker	1 September 1955	Disbanded
127 Gliding School	August 1943	Panshangar	Cadet TX.1	n/a	Panshangar	30 May 1948	Disbanded
128 Gliding School	August 1943	Theale	Cadet TX.1	n/a	Theale	29 July 1948	Disbanded
129 Gliding School	September 1943	Romney Marsh	Cadet TX.1/TX.2	RAF Waltham Cross	RAF North Weald	30 May 1948	Disbanded
130 Gliding School	October 1944	Cowley	Cadet TX.1/TX.2/TX.3; Sedbergh TX.1	RAF Abingdon	RAF Weston-on-the-Green	1 September 1955	Disbanded
141 Gliding School	October 1942	RAF Kidbrooke	Cadet TX.1/TX.2; Sedbergh TX.1	RAF Gravesend; Det: RAF Detling	RAF West Malling	1 September 1955	Disbanded
142 Gliding School	October 1943	Bulphan	Cadet TX.1/TX.2/TX.3; Sedbergh TX.1	RAF Stapleford Tawney; RAF North Weald; RAF Hendon	RAF Hornchurch	1 September 1955	Disbanded
143 Gliding School	October 1942	Hamsey Green	Cadet TX.1/TX.2; Sedbergh TX.1	RAF Croydon	RAF Kenley	1 September 1955	615 Gliding School
144 Gliding School	1943	Hounslow Heath	Cadet TX.1/TX.2	n/a	Heston	March 1948	Disbanded
145 Gliding School	1944	Birch	Cadet TX.1	n/a	RAF Boxted	25 April 1948	Disbanded
146 Gliding School	May 1944	Shenfield	Cadet TX.1/TX.2/TX.3; Sedbergh TX.1B; Prefect TX.1	RAF Fairlop; Det: Camphill	RAF Hornchurch	1 September 1955	614 Gliding School
147 Gliding School	January 1945	Laindon	Cadet TX.1	n/a	RAF Fairlop	January 1946	Disbanded into 146 Gliding School
148 Gliding School	November 1943	Rochford	Cadet TX.1	n/a	Rochford	16 June 1949	Disbanded into 141 Gliding School
149 Gliding School	November 1942	RAF Kidbrooke	Cadet TX.1	n/a	RAF Gravesend	1 December 1945	Disbanded into 141 Gliding School
161 Gliding School	August 1942	Burgess Hill	Cadet TX.1/TX.2/TX.3; Sedbergh TX.1	RAF Brighton; RAF Thorney Island; RAF Shoreham; RAF Ford	Tangmere	1 September 1955	Disbanded
162 Gliding School	October 1943	Hamsey Green	Cadet TX.1/TX.2/TX.3; Sedbergh TX.1	RAF Kenley; RAF Gatwick	RAF Biggin Hill	31 August 1950	Disbanded
163 Gliding School	October 1943	Portsmouth	Cadet TX.1/TX.2	n/a	RAF Gosport	May 1948	Disbanded
166 Gliding School	October 1943	Westwell	Cadet TX.1/TX.2/TX.3; Sedbergh TX.1	n/a	RAF Hawkinge	5 September 1955	Disbanded
167 Gliding School	October 1944	Woking	Cadet TX.1	n/a	RAF Fairoaks	1948	Disbanded
168 Gliding School	January 1945	Rochester	Cadet TX.1/TX.2/TX.3; Sedbergh TX.1	n/a	RAF Detling	1 September 1955	Disbanded
180 Gliding School	November 1951	Warton	Cadet TX.1/TX.2	n/a	RAF Warton	1 September 1955	Disbanded
181 Gliding School	August 1943	Stanley Park	Cadet TX.1/TX.2	n/a	RAF Warton	1 June 1948	Disbanded
182 Gliding School	May 1945	Salmesbury	Cadet TX.1/TX.2; Sedbergh TX.1	n/a	RAF Salmesbury	Unknown	Disbanded
183 Gliding School	March 1944	Wimslow	Cadet TX.1/TX.2/TX.3; Sedbergh TX.1	n/a	RAF Woodford	1 September 1955	Disbanded
184 Gliding School	March 1944	Wimslow	Cadet TX.1	n/a	RAF Woodford	1946	Disbanded into 183 Gliding School
185 Gliding School	March 1944	Barton	Cadet TX.1	n/a	Barton	December 1947	Disbanded
186 Gliding School	June 1944	Speke	Cadet TX.1/TX.2/TX.3; Sedbergh TX.1	RAF Hooton Park; RAF Woodvale	RAF Hawarden	1 September 1955	631 Gliding School
187 Gliding School	March 1944	Manchester	Cadet TX.1	n/a	RAF Stretton	November 1947	Disbanded
188 Gliding School	February 1944	Cark	Cadet TX.1/TX.2/TX.3; Sedbergh TX.1	n/a	RAF Barrow (Walney Island)	1 September 1955	Disbanded
189 Gliding School	June 1945	Kingstown	Cadet TX.1/TX.2	n/a	RAF Kingstown	October 1947	Disbanded
190 Gliding School	May 1945	Cranage	Cadet TX.1	n/a	RAF Woodvale	21 March 1948	Disbanded
192 Gliding School	July 1944	Little Sutton	Cadet TX.1/TX.2/TX.3; Sedbergh TX.1	RAF Hooton Park; RAF Sealand; RAF Woodvale	RAF Hawarden	Unknown	Disbanded

=== 200-700 ===
data
Name	Formed	Formed at	Aircraft	Airfields also used	Disbanded at	Disbanded	Fate
201 Gliding School	June 1943	RAF Lisburn	Cadet TX.1/TX.2	RAF Newtownards	RAF Long Kesh	1947	Disbanded
202 Gliding School	October 1943	Unknown	Unknown	Unknown	Unknown	October 1944	Disbanded
203 Gliding School	Late 1943	Unknown	Cadet TX.1/TX.2/TX.3; Sedbergh TX.1	RAF Newtownards; RAF Downhill; RAF Aldergrove; RAF Sydenham; RAF Toome	Long Kesh	1 September 1955	671 Gliding School
611 Gliding School	1 September 1955	RAF Swanton Morley	Unknown	n/a	RAF Swanton Morley	1984	611 Volunteer Gliding School
612 Gliding School	1 September 1955	RAF Martlesham Heath	Unknown	n/a	RAF Martlesham Heath	6 May 1963	612 Gliding School
612 Gliding School	1 December 1978	RAF White Waltham	Unknown	n/a	RAF Benson	1984	612 Volunteer Gliding School
613 Gliding School	1 September 1955	RAF Halton	Unknown	n/a	RAF Halton	1984	613 Volunteer Gliding School
614 Gliding School	1 September 1955	RAF Hornchurch	Unknown	RAF North Weald	RAF Debden	8 October 1978	614 Gliding School
614 Gliding School	January 1979	RAF Debden	Unknown	n/a	RAF Wethersfield	1984	614 Volunteer Gliding School
615 Gliding School	1 September 1955	RAF Kenley	Unknown	RAF Detling	RAF Kenley	1984	615 Volunteer Gliding School
616 Gliding School	1 June 1958	RAF Henlow	Unknown	n/a	RAF Henlow	1984	616 Volunteer Gliding School
617 Gliding School	November 1958	RAF Hendon	Unknown	RAF Bovingdon	RAF Manston	1984	617 Volunteer Gliding School
618 Gliding School	1 March 1963	RAF Manston	Unknown	n/a	RAF West Malling	1984	618 Volunteer Gliding School
621 Gliding School	1 September 1955	RAF Locking (non flying); RAF Weston-super-Mare	Unknown	Det: Halesland	RAF Locking	1984	621 Volunteer Gliding School
622 Gliding School	1 September 1955	RAF Christchurch	Unknown	RAF Old Sarum	RAF Upavon	1984	622 Volunteer Gliding School
623 Gliding School	1 September 1955	RAF White Waltham	Cadet TX.3; Sedbergh TX.1; Prefect TX.1	n/a	RAF White Waltham	1 May 1963	Disbanded
623 Gliding School	1 July 1963	RAF Tangmere	Cadet TX.3; Sedbergh TX.1	n/a	RAF Tangmere	November 1974	Disbanded
624 Gliding School	1 September 1955	RAF Exeter	Unknown	n/a	RAF Chivenor	1984	624 Volunteer Gliding School
625 Gliding School	June 1958	RAF South Cerney	Unknown	n/a	RAF South Cerney	1984	625 Volunteer Gliding School
626 Gliding School	1 June 1958	RAF St Eval	Unknown	RNAS Culdrose	RNAS Predannack	1984	626 Volunteer Gliding School
631 Gliding School	1 September 1955	RAF Hawarden	Unknown	n/a	RAF Sealand	1984	631 Volunteer Gliding School
632 Gliding School	1 September 1955	RAF Meir	Unknown	n/a	RAF Tern Hill	1984	632 Volunteer Gliding School
633 Gliding School	1 September 1955	RAF Cosford	Unknown	n/a	RAF Cosford	1984	633 Volunteer Gliding School
634 Gliding School	1 September 1955	RAF St Athan	Unknown	RAF Fairwood Common	RAF St Athan	1984	634 Volunteer Gliding School
635 Gliding School	October 1959	RAF Burtonwood	Unknown	n/a	RAF Burtonwood	1984	635 Volunteer Gliding School
636 Gliding School	1 October 1964	RAF Fairwood Common	Unknown	n/a	RAF Fairwood Common	1984	636 Volunteer Gliding School
637 Gliding School	1 April 1966	RAF Gaydon	Unknown	n/a	RAF Little Rissington	1984	637 Volunteer Gliding School
641 Gliding School	1 September 1955	RAF Usworth	Cadet TX.2/TX.3; Sedbergh TX.1	RAF Ouston	RAF Dishforth	1975	Disbanded
642 Gliding School	1 September 1955	RAF Rufforth	Unknown	RAF Driffield	RAF Linton-on-Ouse	1984	642 Volunteer Gliding School
643 Gliding School	1 September 1955	RAF Kirton-in-Lindsey	Cadet TX.3; Sedbergh TX.1	RAF Hemswell (to 1973); RAF Lindholme (from 1973)	RAF Scampton	1984	643 Volunteer Gliding School
644 Gliding School	1 September 1955	RAF Spitalgate	Unknown	RAF Syerston	RAF Newton	1984	644 Volunteer Gliding School
645 Gliding School	1 September 1955	RAF Middleton St George	Unknown	RAF Leeming	RAF Catterick	1984	645 Volunteer Gliding School
661 Gliding School	1 September 1955	RAF Dumfries	Unknown	n/a	RAF Turnhouse	9 January 1964	Absorbed by 663 Gliding School
661 Gliding School	2 April 1967	RAF Kirknewton	Unknown	n/a	RAF Kirknewton	1984	661 Volunteer Gliding School
662 Gliding School	1 September 1955	RAF Edzell	Unknown	RAF Dyce; RAF Dalcross	RAF Arbroath	1984	662 Volunteer Gliding School
663 Gliding School	November 1959	RAF Abbotsinch	Unknown	n/a	RAF Abbotsinch	March 1965	Disbanded
663 Gliding School	7 July 1967	RAF Dyce	Unknown	RAF Dalcross; RAF Milltown	RAF Kinloss	1984	663 Volunteer Gliding School
671 Gliding School	1 September 1955	RAF Long Kesh	Cadet TX.3; Sedbergh TX.1	RAF Aldergrove	RAF Bishops Court	October 1962	Disbanded

== Volunteer Gliding Schools ==
data
Name	Formed	Location	Aircraft	Airfields also used	Renamed at	Renamed	Unit became
611 Volunteer Gliding School	1984	RAF Swanton Morley	Sedbergh TX.1; Prefect TX.1; Cadet TX.3; Regal TX.1; Swallow TX.1; Venture T.1 & T.2; VikingTX.1; Vigilant T.1	RAF Wethersfield; RAF Marham	RAF Watton	2005	611 Volunteer Gliding Squadron
612 Volunteer Gliding School	October 1978	RAF Benson	Sedbergh TX.1; Cadet TX.3; Venture T.2; Vigilant T.1	RAF Halton	RAF Abingdon	2005	612 Volunteer Gliding Squadron
613 Volunteer Gliding School	1984	RAF Halton	Sedbergh TX.1; Prefect TX.1; Cadet TX.3; Swallow TX.1; Venture T.2; Vigilant T.1	n/a	RAF Halton	2005	613 Volunteer Gliding Squadron
614 Volunteer Gliding School	January 1979	MDP Wethersfield	Sedbergh TX.1; Cadet TX.3; Viking TX.1	n/a	RAF Wethersfield	2005	614 Volunteer Gliding Squadron
615 Volunteer Gliding School	1984	RAF Kenley	Sedbergh TX.1; Prefect TX.1; Cadet TX.3; Viking TX.1	n/a	RAF Kenley	2005	615 Volunteer Gliding Squadron
616 Volunteer Gliding School	1984	RAF Henlow	Sedbergh TX.1; Cadet TX.3; Prefect TX.1; Venture T.2; Vigilant T.1	n/a	RAF Henlow	2005	616 Volunteer Gliding Squadron
617 Volunteer Gliding School	1984	RAF Manston	Sedbergh TX.1; Cadet TX.3; Prefect TX.1; Viking TX.1	n/a	Unknown	2005	617 Volunteer Gliding Squadron
618 Volunteer Gliding School	1984	RAF West Malling	Sedbergh TX.1; Cadet TX.3; Prefect TX.1; Grasshopper TX.1; Vanguard TX.1; Valiant TX.1; Viking TX.1	Challock	RAF Odiham	2005	618 Volunteer Gliding Squadron?
621 Volunteer Gliding School	1984	RAF Locking	Sedbergh TX.1; Cadet TX.3; Grasshopper TX.1; Prefect TX.1; Viking TX.1	n/a	RAF Hullavington	2005	621 Volunteer Gliding Squadron
622 Volunteer Gliding School	1984	RAF Upavon	Sedbergh TX.1; Cadet TX.3; Prefect TX.1; Swallow; Viking TX.1	n/a	RAF Hullavington	2005	622 Volunteer Gliding Squadron
624 Volunteer Gliding School	1984	RAF Chivenor	Sedbergh TX.1; Cadet TX.3; Prefect TX.1; Venture T.2; Vigilant T.1	n/a	RAF Chivenor	2005	624 Volunteer Gliding Squadron
625 Volunteer Gliding School	1984	RAF Hullavington	Sedbergh TX.1; Cadet TX.3; Prefect TX.1; Grasshopper TX.1; Venture T.2; Viking TX.1	n/a	RAF Hullavington	2005	625 Volunteer Gliding Squadron
626 Volunteer Gliding School	1984	RNAS Predannack	Sedbergh TX.1; Cadet TX.3; Prefect TX.1; Grasshopper TX.1; Viking TX.1	n/a	RNAS Predannack	2005	626 Volunteer Gliding Squadron
631 Volunteer Gliding School	1984	RAF Sealand	Sedbergh TX.1; Cadet TX.3; Prefect TX.1; Viking TX.1	n/a	RAF Sealand	2005	631 Volunteer Gliding Squadron
632 Volunteer Gliding School	1984	RAF Ternhill	Sedbergh TX.1; Cadet TX.3; Prefect TX.1; Grasshopper TX.1; Venture T.2; Vigilant T.1	n/a	RAF Ternhill	2005	632 Volunteer Gliding Squadron
633 Volunteer Gliding School	1984	RAF Cosford	Sedbbergh TX.1; Cadet TX.3; Prefect TX.1; Grasshopper TX.1; Venture T.2; Vigilant T.1	n/a	RAF Cosford	2005	633 Volunteer Gliding Squadron
634 Volunteer Gliding School	1984	MoD St Athan	Sedbergh TX.1; Cadet TX.3; Prefect TX.1; Viking TX.1	n/a	MoD St Athan	2005	634 Volunteer Gliding Squadron
635 Volunteer Gliding School	1984	Samlesbury Aerodrome	Sedbergh TX.1; Cadet TX.3; Venture T.2; Vigilant T.1	n/a	Samlesbury Aerodrome	2005	635 Volunteer Gliding Squadron
636 Volunteer Gliding School	1984	RAF Fairwood Common	Sedbergh TX.1; Cadet TX.3; Viking TX.1	RAE Aberport	Swansea Airport	2005	636 Volunteer Gliding Squadron
637 Volunteer Gliding School	1984	RAF Little Rissington	Sedbergh TX.1; Cadet TX.3; Grasshopper TX.1; Venture T.2; Vigilant T.1; Viking TX.1	n/a	RAF Little Rissington	2005	637 Volunteer Gliding Squadron
642 Volunteer Gliding School	1984	RAF Linton-on-Ouse	Sedbergh TX.1; Cadet TX.3; Prefect TX.1; Venture T.2; Vigilant T.1	n/a	RAF Linton-on-Ouse	2005	642 Volunteer Gliding Squadron
643 Volunteer Gliding School	1984	RAF Scampton	Sedbergh TX.1; Cadet TX.3; Viking TX.1	RAF Binbrook	RAF Syerston	2005	643 Volunteer Gliding Squadron?
644 Volunteer Gliding School	1984	RAF Newton	Sedbergh TX.1; Cadet TX.3; Prefect TX.1; Venture T.1 & T.2	RAF Syerston	RAF Newton	2005	644 Volunteer Gliding Squadron?
645 Volunteer Gliding School	1984	RAF Catterick	Sedbergh TX.1; Cadet TX.3; Prefect TX.1; Vanguard TX.1; Valiant TX.1; Viking TX.1	RAF Syerston	RAF Topcliffe	2005	645 Volunteer Gliding Squadron
661 Volunteer Gliding School	1984	RAF Kirknewton	Sedbergh TX.1; Cadet TX.3; Prefect TX.1; Swallow TX.1; Viking TX.1	n/a	RAF Kirknewton	2005	661 Volunteer Gliding Squadron
662 Volunteer Gliding School	1984	RAF Arbroath	Sedbergh TX.1; Cadet TX.3; Prefect TX.1; Swallow TX.1; Grasshopper TX.1; Viking TX.1	n/a	RAF Arbroath	2005	662 Volunteer Gliding Squadron
663 Volunteer Gliding School	1984	RAF Kinloss	Sedbergh TX.1; Cadet TX.3; Prefect TX.1; Swallow TX.1; Vigilant T.1	n/a	RAF Kinloss	2005	663 Volunteer Gliding Squadron
664 Volunteer Gliding School	August 1986	RAF Bishops Court	Venture T.1	n/a	RAF Bishops Court	31 October 1990	664 Volunteer Gliding School
664 Volunteer Gliding School	1 November 1995	Belfast City Airport; Newtownards Airport	Vigilant T.1	n/a	Belfast City Airport; Newtownards Airport	2005	664 Volunteer Gliding Squadron

== Other Glider units ==
data
Name	Formed	Formed at	Aircraft	Airfields also used	Disbanded at	Disbanded	Fate
Glider Flight, Cranwell		RAF Cranwell	Cadet TX.1/TX.2; Prefect TX.1; Sedbergh TX.1; Kranich II; Viking TX.1		RAF Cranwell		Active as of 1993
Glider Flight, Halton	17 March 1945	RAF Halton	Cader TX.1/TX.2; Sedbergh TX.1; Venture T.2; Viking TX.1		RAF Halton		Active as of 1993
Glider Instructors Flight	1 February 1943	RAF Shobdon	Master II; Hotspur; Albemarle VI	RAF Hockley Heath	RAF Culmhead	1945	
Glider Instructors School	25 August 1942	RAF Thame	Hind; Hector; Master II; Hotspur II; Oxford I	n/a	RAF Thame	31 January 1943	Replaced by the Glider Instructors; Flight within 5 Glider Training School
Glider Pick-up Training Flight	8 January 1945	RAF Zeals	Dakota III/IV; Hadrian	RAF Ibsley	RAF Ramsbury	15 November 1945	
Glider Pilot Exercise Unit	12 August 1942	RAF Netheravon	Hart; Hind; Hector; Tiger Moth; Master; Hotspur; Hengist; Horsa	Satt: RAF Shrewton; Satt: RAF Chilbolton	RAF Thruxton	1 December 1943	Operational and Refresher Training Unit
Glider Test and Ferry; Flight, Cosford	14 October 1942	RAF Cosford	Whitley V	n/a	RAF Cosford	August 1945	
Glider Test and Ferry; Flight, Kemble	1943	RAF Kemble	Whitley V	n/a	RAF Kemble	15 April 1944	
Glider Test and Ferry; Flight, Wroughton	March 1943	RAF Wroughton	Whitley V Albemarle; Hudson	n/a	RAF Wroughton	August 1945	
1 Glider Training School	1 December 1941	RAF Thame	Hector I Hotspur I & II; Master II; Oxford I Tiger Moth II	RLG: RAF Slade Farm	RAF Croughton	23 March 1943	
1 Glider Training School	1 November 1944	RAF Croughton	Master II; Hotspur II; Tiger Moth II	Satt: RAF Gaydon	RAF Croughton	19 June 1946	
2 Glider Training School	1 December 1941	RAF Thame	Hector I Master II; Hotspur I, II & III	Det: RAF Cheddington; RLG: RAF Slade Farm	RAF Weston-on-the-Green	23 March 1943	
3 Glider Training School	21 July 1942	RAF Stoke Orchard	Master II; Hotspur I & II; Horsa I Albemarle IV & V	RAF Culmhead; Det: RAF Northleach	RAF Wellesbourne Mountford	3 December 1947	
4 Glider Training School	13 July 1942	RAF Kidlington	Hector I Audax I Hind; Hotspur II; Master II	Satt: RAF Kingston Bagpuize	RAF Kidlington	23 March 1943	
5 Glider Training School	30 June 1942	RAF Kidlington	Lysander IIA; Master II; Hotspur II & III	Satt: RAF Hockley Heath	RAF Shobdon	15 November 1945	
Glider Training Squadron	22 September 1940	RAF Ringway	Hector I Tiger Moth II; Hotspur; Hind; 504N	Det: Side Hill	RAF Thame	1 December 1940	
Glider Training Unit	1 June 1942	Abu Sueir	n/a	n/a	Abu Sueir	9 November 1942	
1 Gliding Centre	31 March 1959	RAF Hawkinge	Cadet TX.3; Sedbergh TX.1; Prefect TX.1; Swallow; Grasshopper TX.1	n/a	RAF Swanton Morley	9 August 1971	Central Gliding School
2 Gliding Centre	31 March 1959	RAF Newton	Sedbergh TX.1; Prefect TX.1; Cadet TX.3; Venture I Swallow	RAF Kirton-in-Lindsey	RAF Spitalgate	9 August 1971	Central Gliding School
Home Command Gliding; Instructors School	1 August 1950	RAF Detling	Cadet TX.3; Prefect TX.1; Sedbergh TX.1	n/a	RAF Detling	1 September 1955	Home Command Gliding Centre
Home Command; Gliding Centre	1 August 1955	RAF Detling	Cadet TX.3	n/a	RAF Hawkinge	27 June 1958	1 Home Command Gliding Centre
1 Home Command; Gliding Centre	27 June 1958	RAF Hawkinge	Cadet TX.3	n/a	RAF Hawkinge	31 March 1959	1 Gliding Centre
2 Home Command; Gliding Centre	1 August 1958	RAF Newton	Cadet TX.3	n/a	RAF Newton	31 March 1959	2 Gliding Centre
Glider Exercise Squadron RAF	December 1941	RAF Ringway	Hotspur	RLG: RAF Shrewton	RAF Netheravon	25 January 1942	No. 296 Squadron RAF
Glider Exercise Unit RAF	18 July 1941	RAF Ringway	Hector	Det: RAF Usworth; Det: RAF Kidlington	RAF Ringway	December 1941	Glider Exercise Squadron RAF
Central Gliding School	9 August 1971	RAF Spitalgate	Prefect TX.1; Sedbergh TX.1; Cadet TX.3; Grasshopper TX.1	Det: RAF Swanton Morley	RAF Newton	1 October 1976	Air Cadets Central Gliding School
Heavy Glider; Conversion Unit	1 July 1942	RAF Shrewton	Whitley V Albemarle II & VI; Horsa	RAF North Luffenham; Det: RAF Grove; Det: RAF Woolfox Lodge	RAF Brize Norton	20 October 1944	No. 21 Heavy Glider Conversion Unit RAF; No. 22 Heavy Glider Conversion Unit RAF; No. 23 Heavy Glider Conversion Unit RAF
No. 21 Heavy Glider; Conversion Unit RAF	20 October 1944	RAF Brize Norton	Horsa I & II; Hadrian; Whitley V Albemarle; Halifax A.III; Hadrian I	RAF Elsham Wolds; Satt: RAF Barford St John; Satt: RAF Akeman Street; Satt: RAF Broadwell	RAF North Luffenham	3 December 1947	
No. 22 Heavy Glider; Conversion Unit RAF	15 October 1944	RAF Keevil	Albemarle; Horsa I & II; Hotspur; Hadrian	Satt: RAF Fairford	RAF Blakehill Farm	15 November 1945	
No. 23 Heavy Glider; Conversion Unit RAF	28 October 1944	RAF Peplow	Albemarle II & VI; Horsa I & II; Hadrian I	Satt: RAF Seighford	RAF Peplow	17 January 1945	
101 (Glider) OTU	1 January 1942	RAF Kidlington	Hotspur I, II; Hector I Hind I Tiger Moth I, II; Audax I	RLG: Kiddington; RLG: RAF Slade Farm	RAF Kidlington	13 July 1942	No. 4 Glider Training School
102 (Glider) OTU	10 February 1942	RAF Kidlington	Hector I Hind I Hotspur I, II; Tiger Moth II; Audax I Lysander IIIA	RLG: RAF Kiddington; RLG: RAF Slade Farm	RAF Kidlington	30 June 1942	No. 5 Glider Training School
No. 668 Squadron RAF							
No. 669 Squadron RAF							
No. 670 Squadron RAF							
No. 671 Squadron RAF							
No. 672 Squadron RAF							
No. 673 Squadron RAF							
No. 1 Elementary Gliding Training School RAF	1942						No. 41 Gliding School RAF
No. 2 Elementary Gliding Training School RAF	1942						No. 122 Gliding School RAF
No. 3 Elementary Gliding Training School RAF	1942						No. 123 Gliding School RAF

== See also ==
Royal Air Force

- List of Royal Air Force aircraft squadrons
- List of Royal Air Force aircraft independent flights
- List of conversion units of the Royal Air Force
- List of Royal Air Force Operational Training Units
- List of Royal Air Force schools
- List of Royal Air Force units & establishments
- List of RAF squadron codes
- List of RAF Regiment units
- List of Battle of Britain squadrons
- List of wings of the Royal Air Force
- Royal Air Force roundels

Army Air Corps

- List of Army Air Corps aircraft units

Fleet Air Arm

- List of Fleet Air Arm aircraft squadrons
- List of Fleet Air Arm groups
- List of aircraft units of the Royal Navy
- List of aircraft wings of the Royal Navy

Others

- List of Air Training Corps squadrons
- University Air Squadron
- Air Experience Flight
- Volunteer Gliding Squadron
- United Kingdom military aircraft serial numbers
- United Kingdom aircraft test serials
- British military aircraft designation systems
