= Volunteer Gliding Squadron =

Squadrons of the Royal Air Force which provide gliding experience for Air Cadets

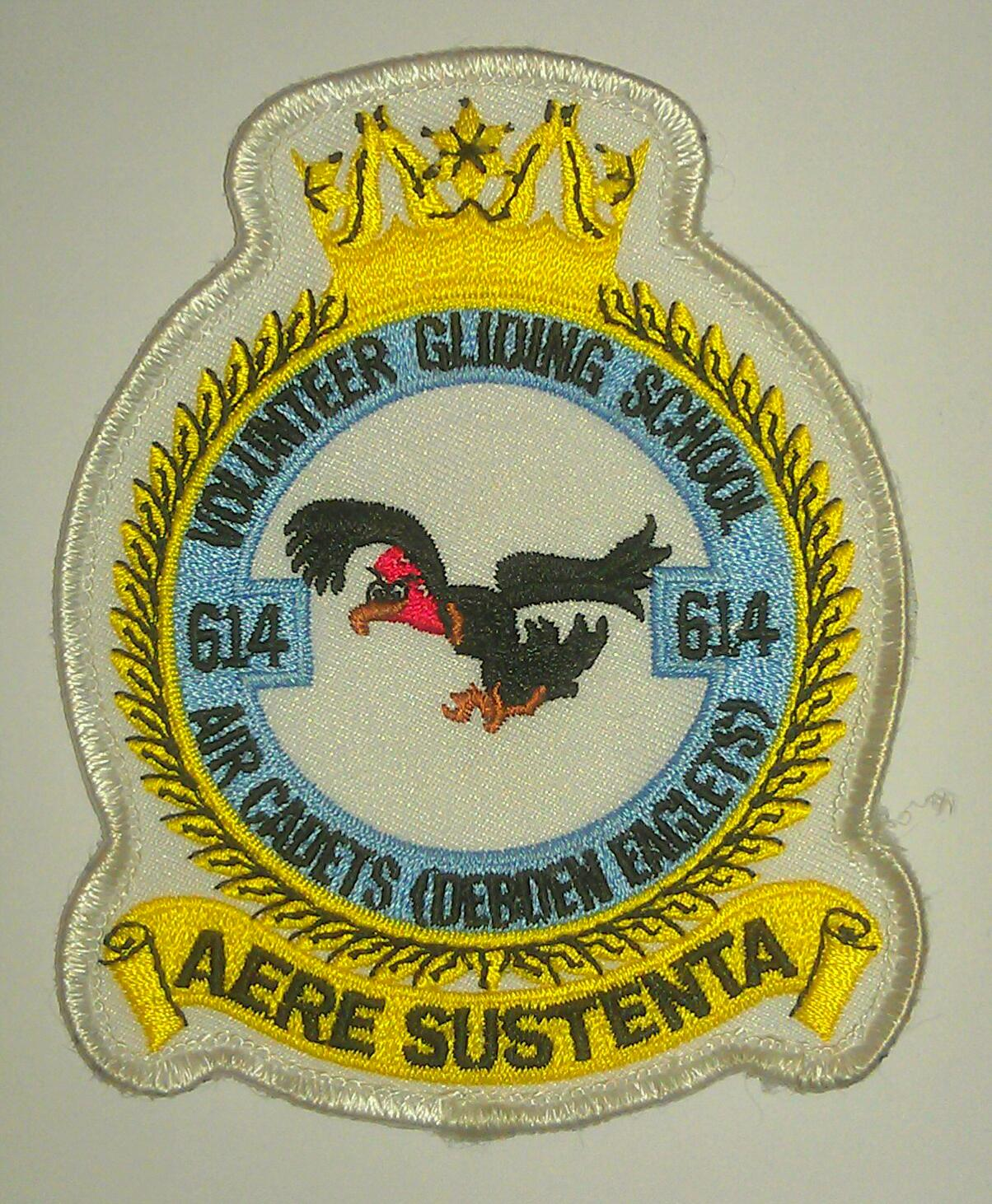
614 Volunteer Gliding School badge, when it was based at RAF Debden.

A Volunteer Gliding Squadron (VGS) is an aircraft squadron of the Royal Air Force (RAF) which provides flying training in glider aircraft for Royal Air Force Air Cadets. All current operational Volunteer Gliding Squadrons operate a sole type of aircraft, the Grob G103A Twin II Acro, a conventional winch-launched tandem-seat sailplane known by its British military designation, Viking T1.

Since 2014, the squadrons operate under No. 2 Flying Training School, which was newly reformed for this purpose at RAF Syerston in Nottinghamshire, within No. 22 (Training) Group of Air Command. The nine currently operational squadrons, along with the Royal Air Force Central Gliding School, are standardised annually by the Royal Air Force Central Flying School. Under the Air Cadet Organisation prior to 2010, Headquarters Air Cadets, based at RAF Cranwell, retains administrative support.

Each VGS is formed entirely of volunteer staff. They are headed by an Officer Commanding, along with several executives, who are appointed by a Cadet Forces Commission in the Royal Air Force Air Cadets (RAFAC). Instructors are a mixture of regular Royal Air Force / Royal Navy / British Army service personnel, reservists, RAFAC personnel, retired Royal Air Force pilots, Civilian Gliding Instructors, and Flight Staff Cadets.

== History ==
Gliding was first introduced for the Air Defence Cadet Corps in 1939, but formally became part of official training with the Air Training Corps in 1942. From 1946, eighty-seven Gliding Schools (GS) came under the Reserve Command.

=== Command ===
Initially, the Gliding Schools were established under RAF Reserve Command, later to become RAF Home Command. In 1955, RAF Flying Training Command took over the responsibility, and amalgamated them into twenty-seven Gliding Schools under Headquarters Air Cadets. At the same time, the Gliding Schools were all renumbered with three-digit numbers, the first two digits being the parent Home Command Group (Nos. 61, 62, 63, 64, 66, or 67). In 1968, RAF Training Command was established, incorporating Flying Training Command. In 1977, Training Command was absorbed into RAF Support Command, and then moved into Personnel and Training Command on its establishment in 1994, before being subsumed into Air Command in March 2007, where the Gliding Schools are today controlled by.

Under Air Command, the chain of command for these units is through No.22 (Training) Group. On behalf of Air Officer Commanding No.22 (Training) Group, the Volunteer Gliding Squadrons and the Central Gliding School are the responsibility of the officer commanding No. 2 Flying Training School.

=== Formation of the Central Gliding School ===
Formulated in 1946, the Home Command Gliding Instructors School (HCGIS) was established in 1949 at RAF Detling to train Qualified Gliding Instructors (QGI) for the Gliding Schools. With the disestablishment of Home Command, HCGIS was split into two Gliding Centres to accommodate the Gliding Schools in the north and south of the United Kingdom. A further reorganisation amalgamated the Gliding Centres into the Central Gliding School (CGS) in 1972 at RAF Spitalgate, where it was renamed the Air Cadet Central Gliding School (ACCGS) in 1974. In 2009, following the formal approval of the CGS unit badge, the Air Cadet Central Gliding School was renamed the Royal Air Force Central Gliding School, and in 2010, restructured under No.1 Elementary Flying Training School (1EFT).

The CGS is commanded by a Royal Air Force Squadron Leader, who also acts as OC Flying for RAF Syerston. The Chief Instructor is also an RAF Squadron Leader. The examiners of the CGS are Flight Lieutenant Royal Air Force Reserve (RAFR) and Squadron Leader RAFR officers, however all future appointments shall be Royal Air Force Volunteer Reserve (Training Branch) RAFVR(T) commissions.

=== From wood to GRP ===
The Royal Air Force chose to re-equip its ageing glider fleet with the first of the modern glass-reinforced plastic (GRP) gliders, and in 1983, acquired an initial batch of ten Schleicher ASK 21, given the British military service name Vanguard TX1. The first examples were delivered to the Air Cadet Central Gliding School (ACCGS) at RAF Syerston in time for the new Instructors' courses to take place. The first VGS to equip with these was 618 VGS, based at RAF West Malling. Instructors from this unit were converted to the new training syllabus, and began flying the type during July and August of that year. The first Vanguard TX1s were delivered to West Malling in July 1983, and training for cadets began in August the same year.

After the initial ten were delivered, Alexander Schleicher was unwilling to open a production line for the Ministry of Defence (MoD), as they did not want to sideline their civilian market. A tender was issued, and Grob Aerospace was awarded the contract to supply one hundred Grob G103A Twin II Acro gliders. The RAF named the military variant as the Viking T1 in Air Cadet service. A single specimen was delivered to Slingsby Aviation in the UK for fatigue life testing.

aircraft operated by the Royal Air Force (RAF) Volunteer Gliding Squadrons (VGS) (and their precedents)
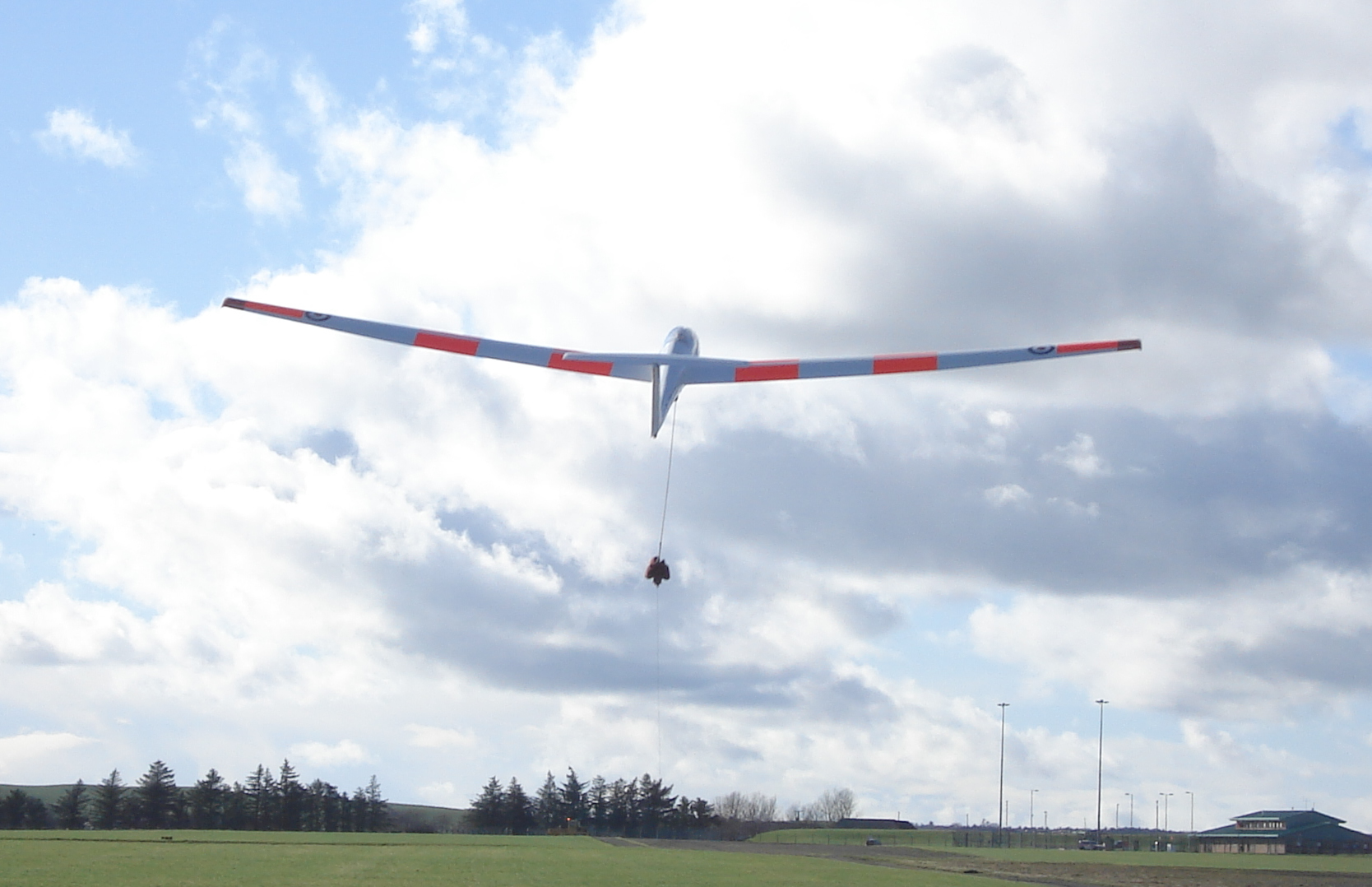
Viking T1 winch launched at RM Condor, Scotland

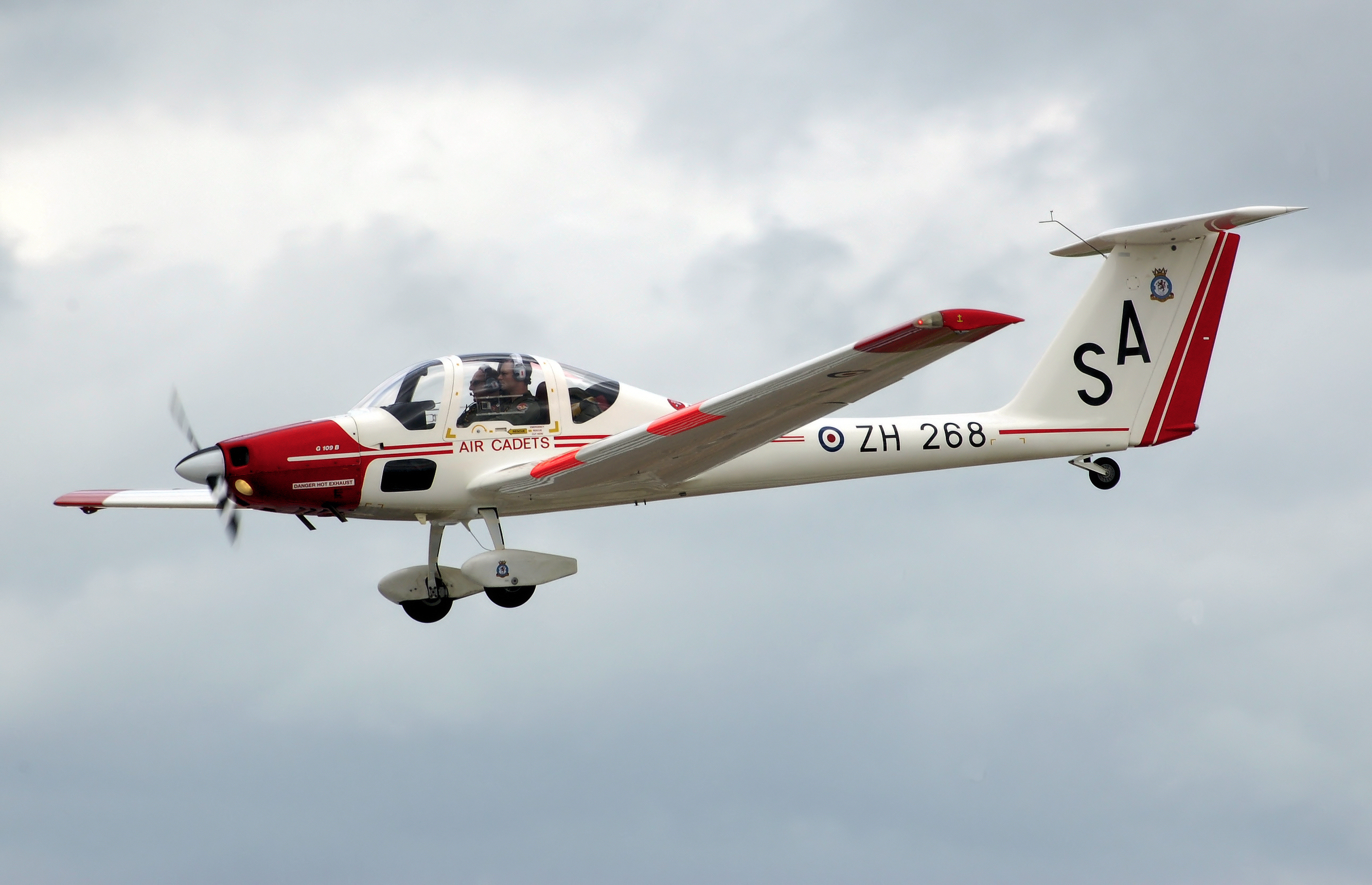
Vigilant T1 motor glider lands at RIAT 2008, England

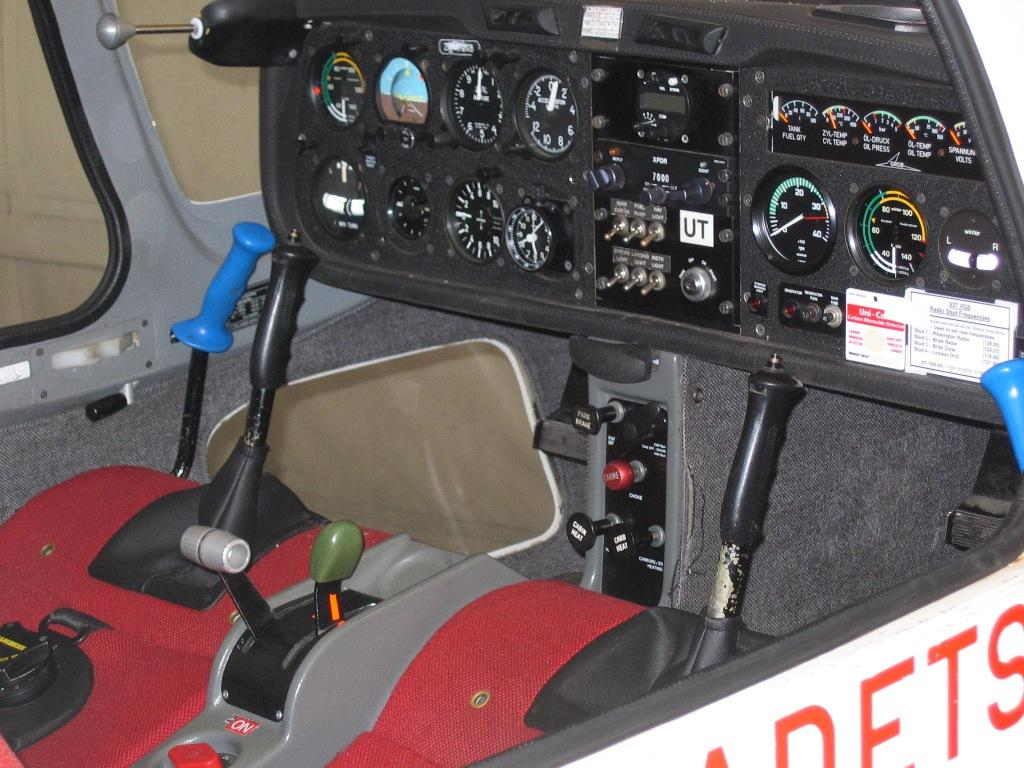
Vigilant T1 motor glider cockpit

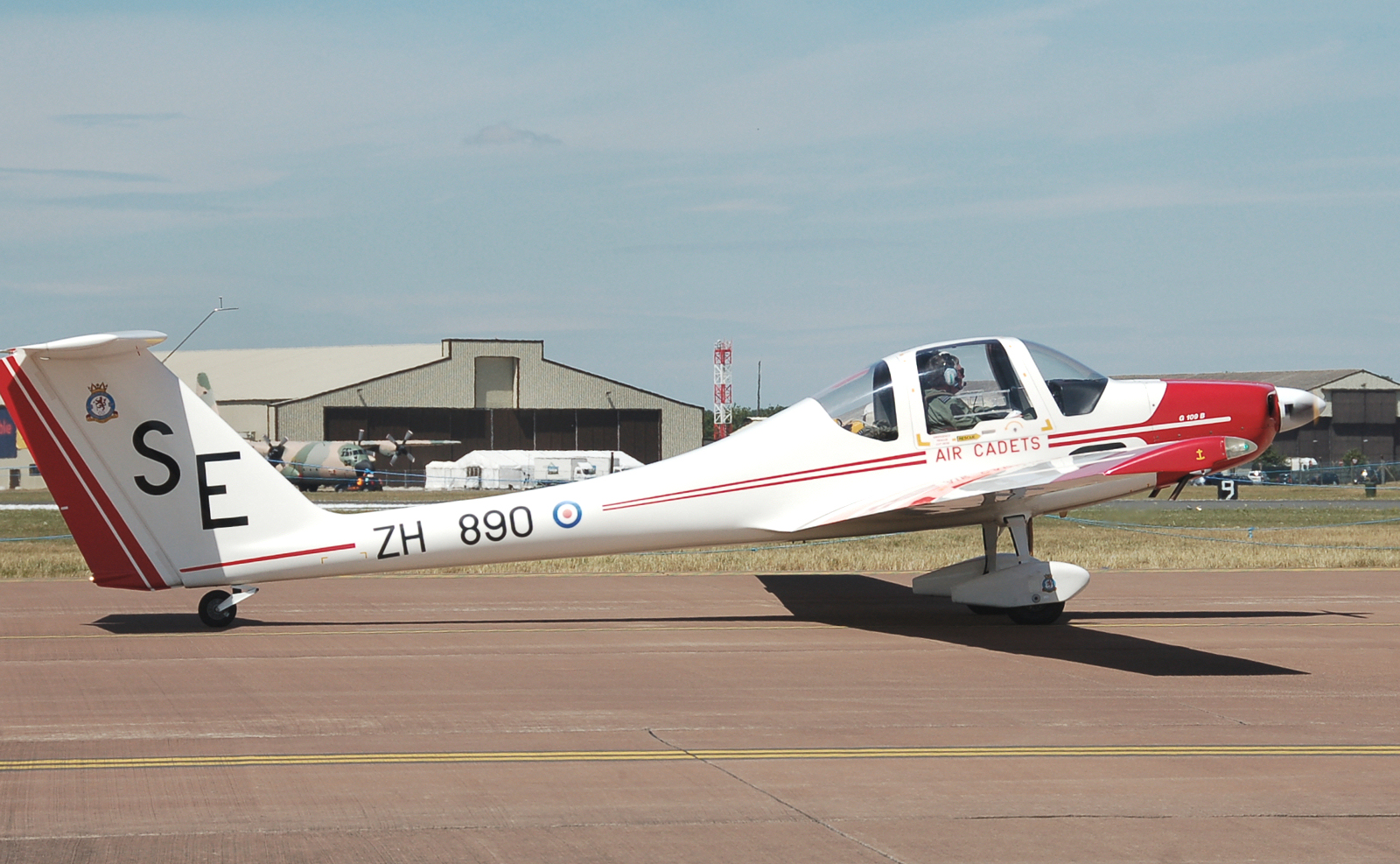
Vigilant T1 at the 2010 Royal International Air Tattoo, RAF Fairford, Gloucestershire

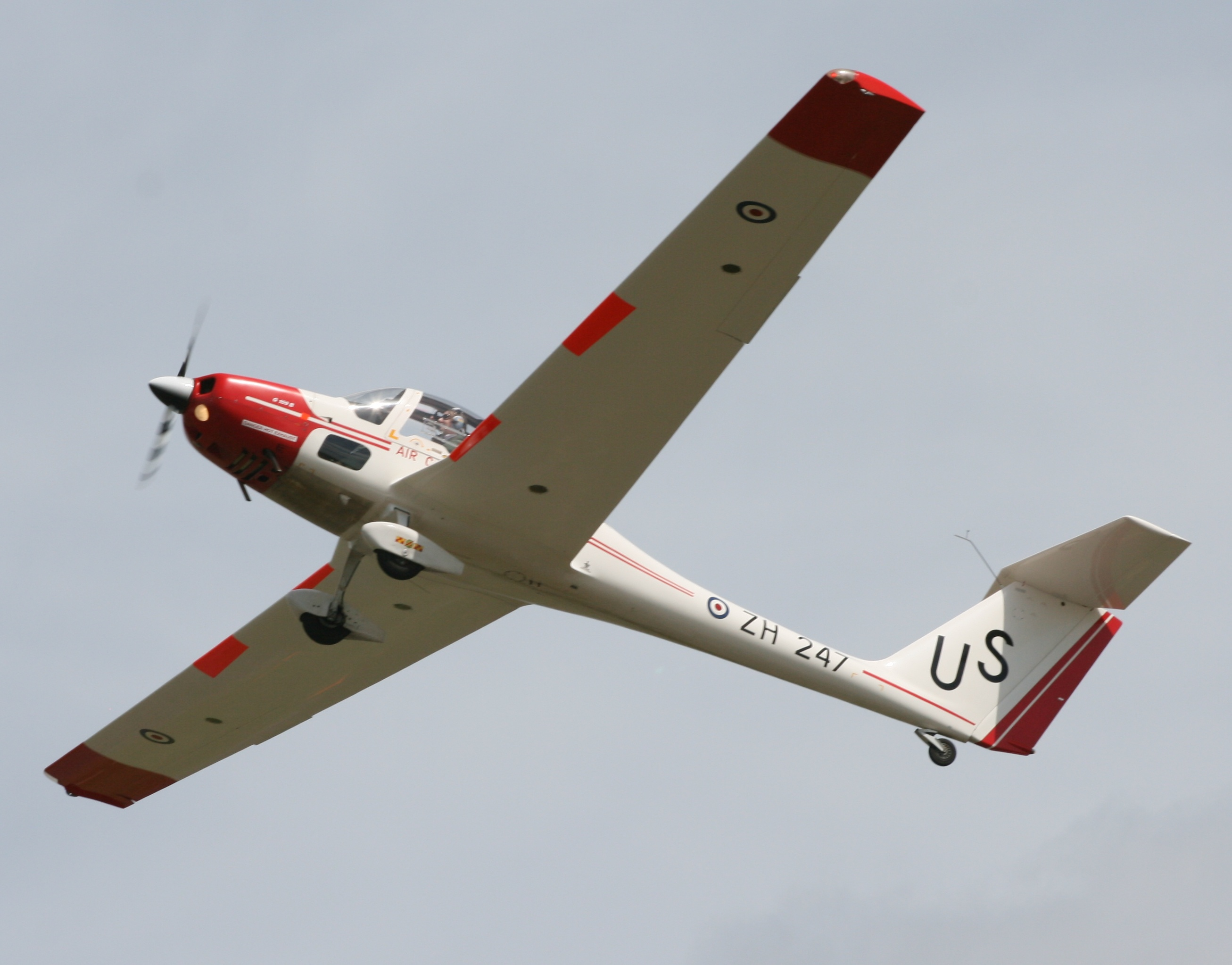
Vigilant T1 at Farnborough Airfield during the 2008 Farnborough Airshow

=== Introduction of motor gliders ===
The Slingsby Falke motor glider, known in the Royal Air Force as Venture T1, was trialled at the Air Cadet Central Gliding School (ACCGS) at RAF Spitalgate from 1971 to 1973. Ten Glider Schools (GS) were first issued with the T1 variant in 1977, but were quickly upgraded with the TX2. The development of many sites and closures of many RAF aerodromes put strain on many conventional VGS. Further GSs were allocated with the TX2s. In 1991, the Venture TX2 was replaced with the Grob G-109B motor glider, Royal Air Force name Vigilant T1. Originally designated the Vigilant TX1, the glider designation 'X' was dropped due to its change of role.

=== Disbandment of the competition fleet ===
In 2000, Air Cadet Organisation (ACO) Chief of Staff (COS) Group Captain Mike Cross announced the sale of the Valiant TX1 and Kestrel TX1 fleets. This concluded the RAF's many successful years competing in national gliding competitions and setting world records.

=== Schools to squadrons ===
Initially established as Gliding Schools (GS), they were all re-designated Volunteer Gliding Schools (VGS) in 1978. In 2005, following a decision by the Royal Air Force Board, they were again renamed Volunteer Gliding Squadrons, thus keeping their VGS abbreviation.

=== Air Cadets to Royal Air Force ===
Following the restructure in 2005, a further reorganisation was initiated in 2010 by Air Officer Commanding (AOC) 22 Group RAF. On 1 April 2010, Command and Control, together with the responsibility for supervision and regulation of the Central Gliding School and the then twenty-seven Volunteer Gliding Squadrons, was moved from the Air Cadet Organisation (ACO) to the Directorate of Flying Training (DFT) under No. 1 Elementary Flying School RAF (No1 EFTS). A further restructure in December 2011 saw No1 EFTS absorbed into No. 3 Flying Training School (3FTS), together with a gliding branch of the school developed from No1 EFTS.

=== Extended pause and reinvention ===
With the introduction of the Grob Prefect T1 (RAF name for the Grob G 120TP, an update of the Tutor T1, notably with a glass-cockpit and retractable undercarriage) into UK Military Elementary Flying Training, the RAF's fleet of Grob Tutor T1 (Grob G 115) faced a reduction against the Vigilant T1 motor glider, due to competing roles for powered flying for Air Cadets. 22 Group decided the Vigilant T1 had to be withdrawn, to protect the Air Experience Flights (AEFs), which are operated by volunteer retired RAF officers, despite the Vigilant T1 motor glider's more capable role and potential to enable cadets solo flying. In April 2014, all Air Cadet Organisation gliding was abruptly halted under the auspices of 'airworthiness concerns'. Maintenance records managed by contractor Serco were found to be in disarray. Flying resumed to a limited extent in 2016.

In March 2016, a major restructuring of Air Cadet gliding and flying was announced, resulting in the disbanding of fourteen Volunteer Gliding Squadrons, significant reduction of the Vigilant motor glider, a regional focus of remaining Viking squadrons, and an increase in Tutor Air Experience Flight (AEF) flying. With the Vigilant due to be withdrawn from service in 2019, its retirement was brought forward to May 2018. Two new AEF squadrons were to be formed.

A review of the Defence Estate, published in November 2016, confirmed the disbandments announced in March, and gave estimated dates for disposal of several sites.

Despite the Vigilant T1 motor glider fleet being declared un-airworthy and uneconomical to return to the air, all sixty-three grounded Vigilant T1 were sold to Hampshire-based charity Aerobility, which works with people with disabilities and injured ex-military personnel. A number would be modified and refurbished for use by the charity, while the majority would be sold to support the charity.

== Current glider units ==
=== Central Flying School ===
- HQ, No. 2 Flying Training School RAF — RAF Syerston, Nottinghamshire
- Central Gliding School — RAF Syerston, Nottinghamshire

=== Conventional glider VGSs (Viking) ===
- 611 VGS — RAF Honington, Suffolk
- 612 VGS — RAF Little Rissington, Gloucestershire (previously 621 and 637 VGS’)
- 615 VGS — RAF Kenley, Greater London
- 622 VGS — Upavon Station, Wiltshire
- 626 VGS — RNAS Predannack, Cornwall
- 632 VGS — RAF Tern Hill, Shropshire, (currently stationed at RAF Woodvale)
- 644 VGS — RAF Syerston, Nottinghamshire
- 645 VGS — RAF Topcliffe, North Yorkshire
- 661 VGS — RAF Kirknewton, West Lothian, Scotland

== Disbanded glider units ==
=== Conventional glider VGSs ===
- 614 VGS — MDP Wethersfield, Essex
- 617 VGS — formerly at RAF Manston before that at RAF Bovingdon and originally at RAF Hendon
- 621 VGS — RAF Little Rissington as of 1 Sept 2024
- 623 VGS — RAF Tangmere
- 625 VGS — Hullavington, formerly 83 GS, amalgamated with 621 VGS, 1 August 2013
- 631 VGS — RAF Woodvale, formerly 186 GS
- 637 VGS — RAF Little Rissington as of 1 Sept 2024 (previously a motor glider unit)
- 643 VGS — RAF Syerston, formerly 107 EGS, amalgamated with 644 VGS, 1 August 2013
- 662 VGS — RM Condor, formerly 2 GS and 5 GS, closure announced on 10 March 2016

=== Motor glider VGSs ===
- 611 VGS — RAF Honington, formerly 102 GS and formerly at RAF Swanton Morley, and after that at STANTA Airfield (RAF Watton), subsequently reformed with the Viking at RAF Honington
- 612 VGS — Dalton Barracks, formerly 104 GS, disbanded 14 August 2016
- 613 VGS — RAF Halton, formerly 122 GS, closure announced on 10 March 2016
- 616 VGS — RAF Henlow, formerly 106 GS, closure announced on 10 March 2016
- 618 VGS — RAF Odiham, formerly at RAF West Malling, formerly 146 GS and 168 GS, closure announced on 10 March 2016
- 624 VGS — RMB Chivenor, formerly 84 GS, closure announced on 10 March 2016
- 633 VGS — RAF Cosford, closure announced on 10 March 2016
- 634 VGS — MOD St. Athan, formerly 68 GS, closure announced on 10 March 2016
- 635 VGS — RAF Topcliffe, formerly at BAE Samlesbury, closure announced on 10 March 2016
- 636 VGS — Swansea Airport, closure announced on 10 March 2016
- 642 VGS — RAF Linton-on-Ouse, formerly 23 GS, closure announced on 10 March 2016
- 663 VGS — RAF Kinloss, closure announced on 10 March 2016
- 664 VGS — Newtownards, closure announced on 10 March 2016

== Structure ==
=== Personnel ===
Staff of a Volunteer Gliding Squadron are part-time personnel (usually specifically appointed Cadet Forces Officers and civilians), supernumerary personnel (who are either regular or reservist members of the British Armed Forces or Cadet Force Volunteers), and Flight Staff Cadets.

==== Appointed personnel ====
Cadet Forces Officers are appointed to fulfil management positions mandated to operate a squadron. Civilians start under probation as Under Training Instructors; their probation ends on attaining B2 Category Qualified Gliding Instructor (QGI) status. Personnel typically attain a B1 Category QGI rating before qualifying for a Cadet Forces Commission for an intended appointment. Executive Officers (XOs) head the leadership of the Squadron as Officer Commanding (OC), Chief Flying Instructor (CFI), and Deputy Chief Flying Instructor (DCFI).

Commissioned officer posts on VGS include:

- Officer Commanding (OC), in the rank of Squadron Leader
- Chief Flying Instructor (CFI), in the rank of Flight Lieutenant

Other appointed roles, which can be filled by commissioned or non-commissioned personnel include:

- Executive Officer (XO)
- Quality and Engineering Standards Officer (QESO)
- Adjutant
- Technical Mechanical Transport Officer (TechMTO)
- Training Officer (TrgO)
- Chief Ground Instructor
- Equipment Officer
- Health & Safety Officer (HSO)
- Flight Safety Officer (FSO)
- Infrastructure Officer
- Unit Security Officer (USyO)
- Cadet Liaison Officer (CLO)

==== Supernumerary personnel ====
Supernumerary personnel are part-time staff whose primary appointment is elsewhere within the British Armed Forces, thus their VGS appointment is their secondary duty. They are from various commissioned and non-commissioned roles of the regular, reserve, and cadet forces.

==== Flight Staff Cadets ====
Air Cadets from either the Combined Cadet Force (CCF) or Air Training Corps (ATC) can be appointed as Flight Staff Cadets (FSC) on a VGS. FSCs are selected, usually after completing Advanced Glider Training, from those who show potential to become Gliding Instructors. FSCs do not act as a substitute for VGS adult personnel, primarily providing ground support to the squadrons. However, they are able to progress to a B2 Category status (less the supervisory privileges).

=== Flying training ===
Flying training is carried out to the syllabus of the RAF Central Flying School. Ab-initio training starts with three initial courses, followed with Basic Pilot Training to achieve flying grades.

- Glider Induction Flight (GIF) – typically a couple of launches designed to give a basic appreciation of aircraft handling.
- Gliding Scholarship (GS) – course to complete the GS syllabus. Two sets of wings can be awarded to Air Cadets: blue for completing the GS syllabus to the required standard, and silver for flying a solo circuit.
- Advanced Gliding Training (AGT) – course to provide a greater appreciation of advanced handling, and five additional solo circuits. Trainees attain the aircrew training standard AGT. Air Cadets completing this course are awarded gold wings.

=== Flying qualifications ===
The following pilot qualifications can be obtained on VGSs:

- Pilot Grade 2 (G2) – qualified solo on aircraft type.
- Pilot Grade 1 (G1) – qualified on aircraft type, allowing flying with passengers. G1s are additionally authorised to teach the Glider Induction Flight and the initial exercise of the Gliding Scholarship.

Instructor qualifications can be attained following the completion of a course at the Royal Air Force Central Gliding School:

- B2 Category Instructor – a Qualified Gliding Instructor that requires close supervision.
- B1 Category Instructor – a competent Qualified Gliding Instructor.

Higher instructor qualifications can be attained following the completion of an examination by the Royal Air Force Central Flying School Gliding Examiners:

- A2 Category Instructor – an above average Qualified Gliding Instructor; this qualification is denoted by the symbol cfs(g) in the Air Force List for commissioned instructors.
- A1 Category Instructor – an exceptional Qualified Gliding Instructor; this qualification is denoted by the symbol cfs*(g) in the Air Force List for commissioned instructors.

Additional ratings:

- Flying Supervisor (FS) – for the roles of OC, CFI and DCFI; this is notated by a * after the category, e.g. A2*.

== Aircraft ==
=== Conventional gliders ===
==== In service ====
- Grob Aerospace Viking T1 — one-hundred originally entered service, later reduced to around seventy-seven.

==== Retired from service ====
===== Non-GRP construction =====
====== Single-seat ======
- BAC BAC TX1 — one entered service;
- Slingsby Cadet TX1 — 362 entered service;
- Slingsby Cadet TX2 — sixty-nine entered service;
- Slingsby Grasshopper TX1 — 115 entered service;
- Slingsby Gull TX1 — one entered service;
- Slingsby Kite TX1 — one entered service;
- Slingsby King Kite TX1 — one entered service;
- Slingsby Prefect TX1 — fifteen entered service;
- Slingsby Primary TX1 — thirty-one entered service;
- Slingsby Swallow TX1 — five entered service.

====== Dual-seat ======
- Slingsby Cadet TX3 — 126 entered service;
- Slingsby Falcon TX3 — seven entered service;
- Slingsby Sedbergh TX1 — ninety-five entered service.

===== GRP construction =====
====== Single-seat ======
- Schleicher Valiant TX1 — five entered service.

====== Dual-seat ======
- Schleicher Vanguard TX1 — ten entered service;
- Schempp-Hirth Kestrel TX1 — two entered service.

=== Motor gliders ===
==== Retired from service ====
- Slingsby Venture TX1 — one entered service, mainly used at Air Cadet Central Gliding School (ACCGS);
- Slingsby Venture TX2 — fifteen originally entered service, followed by a further twenty-five;
- Grob Vigilant T1 — fifty-three originally entered service, later increased to sixty-three, retired from service on 6 May 2018.

== See also ==
- Royal Air Force
- List of aircraft of the RAF
