= RAF Meir =

RAF Meir
- Stoke-on-Trent, Staffordshire in England

Site information
- Owner: Air Ministry
- Operator: Royal Air Force
- Controlled by: RAF Flying Training Command

Location
- Shown within Staffordshire
- Coordinates: 52°58′13″N 2°05′45″W

Site history
- Built: 1920
- In use: 1920-1973
- Battles/wars: Second World War

Royal Air Force Meir or more simply RAF Meir is a former Royal Air Force station located in Stoke-on-Trent, Staffordshire, England.

== Formation ==
In the late 1920s, Stoke-on-Trent, like many towns and cities in the UK, felt a need for a municipal airport, and after considering several sites, selected a site at Meir, Staffordshire. The airfield opened on 18 May 1934, and was used by the North Staffordshire Aero Club. Scheduled airline services at Meir began on 12 August 1935, with Railway Air Services' Croyden–Belfast–Glasgow route, using de Havilland DH.86 airliners, calling at Meir on request. On 11 September 1937, Meir Aerodrome was used as a turning point for the final of the King's Cup air race.

On 1 August 1938, the aerodrome gained a new role when No. 28 Elementary and Reserve Flying Training School RAF (28 E&RFTS) was formed. The Elementary and Reserve schools were civilian ran units with RAF instructors and aircraft, which provided basic training during weekdays with Volunteer Reserve pilots flying during the weekends. 28 E&RFTS was run by Reid and Sigrist, and operated the Miles Magister elementary trainer, Hawker Hart and Hawker Hind advanced trainers and the Avro Anson twin-engined trainer. Meir lost its scheduled air service in 1939.

== Second World War ==
The declaration of war against Germany on 3 September 1939 prohibited private flying, and as a result, the civilian-ran Elementary and Reserve schools were shut down. Meir was unused for several months until February 1940 when the advanced party for what would become No. 1 Practice Flying Unit (1 PFU) arrived. This was intended to receive pilots who had graduated from Flying Training Schools and keep them current in flying practice until they could be posted to operational units. The unit was planned to accommodate 240 pilots (120 officers and 120 sergeant pilots), and so needed a large inventory of aircraft - the planned establishment was over 50 aircraft, while in practice the unit had about 40 Hawker Hectors and Hinds, together with some de Havilland Dominies and Gloster Gladiators. Little flying was done, consisting mainly of training with locally based army units, and 1 PFU was disbanded on 16 June 1940, with its role being taken over by Operational Training Units (OTUs).

The PFU was replaced at Meir by the Miles Magisters of 5 Elementary Flying Training School (5 EFTS) which moved in from Hanworth in Middlesex, which was vulnerable to enemy action. 5 EFTS started operations at Meir on 17 June. While instructors and civilian personnel were housed in nearby requisitioned houses, pupils were accommodated at Longton Town Hall, in poor conditions and 2 miles (3.2 km) from the airfield. In October 1940, the situation was improved when Meir Drill hall, only 0.5 miles (0.80 km) from the airfield was handed over from the Army to the RAF, and used to house pupils for 5 EFTS. As winter came, operations from Meir were hindered by parts of the grass landing ground turning to mud, and poor visibility due to smog from the industry of the Potteries. The proximity of high ground to the airfield also caused problems for trainee pilots, and RAF Abbots Bromley was used as a relief landing ground for Meir. In October 1941, in an order to reduce congestion, 5 EFTS was downgraded from a Class A unit, handling 120 pupils and having an establishment of 72 aircraft, to a Class B unit with 90 pupils and 54 aircraft. 5 EFTS was disbanded on 23 December 1941, with Meir continuing as a relief landing ground for 16 Elementary Flying Training School (16 EFTS) based at RAF Burnaston, Derby. In August 1942, 45 Gliding School, operating at weekends for the rest of the war.

== Shadow factory ==
In late 1941, construction began of a Shadow Factory for production of aircraft at nearby Blythe Bridge. The factory was allocated to be operated by Rootes Group, and initially was employed in building Bristol Blenheims, which after completion, would be taxied the 0.5 miles (0.80 km) to RAF Meir for flight testing. In order to support operations of Blenheims, which were much heavier than the Magister, a 3,000 feet (910 m) long x 150 feet (46 m) wide concrete runway was built. The Blenheim IV was produced at Blythe Bridge from May to October 1942, with production then switching to the Blenheim V, which was built until June 1943. In January 1943, a second type, the Bristol Beaufighter entered production at the Blythe Bridge factory, starting with the Beaufighter VI, and later changing to the Beaufighter TF.X torpedo bomber.

In 1944, the factory gained the task of modifying North American Mustang fighters and North American Harvard trainers, received from America under the Lend-Lease scheme, for use by the RAF. Aircraft work at the Blythe Bridge factory ended in September 1945, although Rootes continued to operate the factory.

== Post war operations ==
Following the end of the Second World War, civil flying returned, with a few light aircraft using the airfield, while Staffordshire Potteries used it as a base for executive aircraft. 45 Gliding School remained at the airfield, and was renamed 632 Gliding School on 1 September 1955. The RAF finally left the airfield for good in 1963, when 632 Gliding School moved to RAF Tern Hill.

Meir Aerodrome closed in the early 1970s and the site has now become the Meir Park housing estate. The earlier parts have mainly aviation-associated street names. The last official flight was on 16 August 1973 when Fred Holdcroft flew a Piper Tri-Pacer carrying a Sentinel journalist to Manchester. The last unofficial flight "a year or two" later by Eric Clutton was in a home-made folding machine called FRED (Flying Runabout Experimental Design) which the pilot towed home behind his car.
