= Haddenham Airfield =

Airfield in Buckinghamshire, England

- IATA: none; ICAO: none

Summary
- Airport type: Private
- Owner: Upward Bound Trust
- Operator: Upward Bound Trust
- Location: Haddenham, Buckinghamshire, England
- Closed: 2018
- Elevation AMSL: 285 ft / 97 m
- Coordinates: 51°46′35″N 000°56′30″W
- Website: www.ubt.org.uk

Map
- Location in Buckinghamshire

Haddenham Airfield was an airfield on the outskirts of the English village of Haddenham, Buckinghamshire.

Originally a Second World War airfield called RAF Thame it later came under civil owners Airtech Limited who were based there until the 1990s.

== History ==
The site was originally RAF Thame.

The following units were posted here at some point:

- No. 1 Glider Training School RAF.
- No. 2 Glider Training School RAF.
- No. 5 (Training) Ferry Pool ATA.
- No. 12 Operational Training Unit RAF.
- ATA Initial Flying Training School.
- ATA (Training) Ferry Pool.
- Glider Instructors School RAF.
- Glider Training Squadron RAF.

== Current use ==
In 1965 the airfield started gliding operations run by the Upward Bound Trust.

The Upward Bound Trust is a charity that provides glider training for those over the age of 16. With the building of an industrial estate the trust held a hangar appeal supported by the local community of Haddenham, it raised enough money to build a new hangar and a new access road.

The last flight from the airfield was made on 9 December 2018. The site was designated for redevelopment for housing and industrial use.
