= No. 621 Volunteer Gliding Squadron =

No.621 Volunteer Gliding Squadron RAF
- 621 VGS
- No. 621 Squadron Badge
- Active: 1943–present
- Country: United Kingdom
- Branch: Royal Air Force
- Role: Training
- Part of: No. 2 Flying Training School RAF
- Garrison/HQ: RAF Little Rissington
- Motto(s): Altivolus ad Felicis ("Soaring to Success")

Commanders
- Current commander: Sqn Ldr Phil Woods

Insignia
- Identification symbol: Wyvern Holding a Flaming Torch over Coastal Waves

Aircraft flown
- Trainer: Grob Viking TX.1

621 VGS is a Volunteer Gliding Squadron based at RAF Little Rissington in Gloucestershire, United Kingdom. 621 VGS is one of 10 remaining Volunteer Gliding Squadrons and operates under No.2 Flying Training School, within No.22 (Training) Group of the Royal Air Force Air Command.

== Background ==
Volunteer Gliding Squadrons (VGSs) are Royal Air Force Flying Training units, operating military Viking TX.1 conventional gliders to train cadets from the Air Training Corps and the RAF section of the Combined Cadet Force.

Since 2014, the squadrons operate under No. 2 Flying Training School, which was newly reformed for this purpose at RAF Syerston, Nottinghamshire, within No.22 (Training) Group of the Royal Air Force Air Command. The 10 Units, along with the Royal Air Force Central Gliding School, are standardised annually by the Royal Air Force Central Flying School. Formerly under the Air Cadet Organisation prior to 2010, Headquarters Air Cadets presently still retains administrative support.

VGSs are made up of volunteer staff. Each is headed by a Commanding Officer and several executives, all of whom are commissioned into the Training Branch of the Royal Air Force Volunteer Reserve. Instructors comprise a mixture of regular RAF/RN/Army personnel, FTRS/Reservists, RAFAC personnel, Civilian Gliding Instructors (CGIs) and Flight Staff Cadets (FSCs).

== 87 Gliding School 1943–1955 ==
No. 621 VGS is the natural descendant of 87 Gliding School, formed in the early days of Air Training Corps gliding, and over time has seen the transition from single-seater primary gliders capable of short ground-hops to high-performance two-seater sailplanes, used for elementary training.

=== RAF Weston-Super-Mare ===
87 Gliding School commenced operations in the spring of 1943 at RAF Weston-Super-Mare . It was opened under the command of Prince Bira, who was an exiled member of the Thailand royal family (although never formally recognised as the school's OC).

Post-WWII, the tenure on Weston Airfield looked doubtful so a search was started to find a new airfield. Coincidentally, at the same time the District Gliding Officer for 62 Group (Sqn Ldr A Phillips) was looking for a replacement airfield for his instructor courses, specifically a hilltop site because he believed that soaring would help increase the standard of the instructors. At that time Sqn Ldr Phillips was running instructor courses for his area at Charmy Down airfield (just north of Bath). Both of these searches came together in a field above Draycott on the Mendip hills, which became known as Halesland.

== 621 Volunteer Gliding School, 1955–2005 ==
During the 1950s a rationalization was carried out, which saw the demise of many Gliding Schools and the mergers of others. With this came the change of numbers: 87 GS became 621 GS. These new numbers reflected the Group the Gliding Schools were in, 62 group, hence 621 Gliding School. (In the late 1940s, the schools were organised into Groups within the 'Home Command', the Southwest being 62 Group).

621 Gliding School was officially formed on 1 September 1955 at RAF Weston-Super-Mare.

=== RAF Weston-Super-Mare 1943–1993 and Halesland Airfield 195?–1985 ===
After searching for a replacement airfield to operate from, it turned out the tenure at RAF Weston-Super-Mare was secure and 621 VGS stayed at RAF Weston-Super-Mare with advanced and Instructor courses being carried out at Halesland. When 87 GS was formed, there was a Bessineux Hangar and two Nissen Huts, no electricity, no Toilets and only gas for heating and lighting. This remained the same for some 40 years later. Later, a purpose-built hut, for use of 621 VGS, with all modern conveniences was erected and is still standing to this day.

In 1978 Gliding Schools were re-designated as Volunteer Gliding Schools, creating the acronym VGS.

The Air cadets abandoned the Halesland Airfield site in 1985; it was thought the new GRP gliders could not cope with the rough ground and size of the field. It was taken over by the Woodspring Gliding Club (now Mendip GC) which has operated very successfully since.

After the new building was completed the tenure of the airfield started to change. The MoD sold the airfield to Westland Helicopters but ensured the Gliding School had a lease for the buildings and right of access to the airfield. This was fine until Westlands started to have a few problems and they started to decrease their operations at Weston. Eventually the airfield was sold to a development company, initially planning to turn it into a theme park. This did not come about as the development company went bust and the airfield was put into receivership. This carried on over many years until the Gliding schools position became untenable because lack of airfield support services.

However, the Gliding School was sitting tenants the airfield could not be sold on by the receivers.

Several attempts were made to find an alternative site during the late eighties, namely RNAS Merryfield and RAF Keevil. 621VGS spent two weekends at RNAS Merryfield (Satellite airfield to RNAS Yeovilton), to assess it's suitability. However, at a public meeting held to discuss the move, many of the residents, living next to the airfield, objected to the gliders flying over their properties, claiming they would be noisy and intrusive, the Navy believed them and blocked the move. Thus, at the beginning of 1993 the decision was made to move 621 VGS to RAF Hullavington although a special request was made and granted to leave 621 VGS at Weston until the summer so the school could celebrate its 50th anniversary at the same airfield at which it started. On 27 June 1993 the last flight took place from Weston.

=== RAF Hullavington 1993–2005 ===
When RAF Hullavington became available, it was decided to move both 625 VGS from RAF South Cerny into Hullavington as well as 621 VGS, also due to airfield problems. Hullavington was big enough to take the joint operation and the camp was very willing to support the two schools. At that time the camp was being transferred from RAF command to the Army (9 Supply Regiment).

As the years progressed the school became much more productive because of the size and well-kept surface of the airfield and this has enabled the staff numbers to grow. The school was rewarded for this far greater efficiency by winning the Sir Arthur Marshall Trophy for best Winch launch school in 1994 and 1999.

In 2003 the school celebrated its 60th anniversary, with a visit from HRH Duke of York. Prince Andrew first flew solo with the Air Cadets in a Sedburgh, and 621 VGS managed to track down the very aircraft – WB922, which is now part of the 621 VGS Historic Flight, a private syndicate containing various ex-Air Cadet Gliding Aircraft.

In 2005, following a decision by the Royal Air Force Board, the VGSs were renamed Volunteer Gliding Squadrons, keeping their VGS acronym, which 621 VGS designed an updated Squadron Crest to Reflect this Change.

== 621 Volunteer Gliding Squadron, 2005–present ==
=== RAF Hullavington 2005–2015 ===
On 1 August 2013, the original VGS at RAF Hullavington (625 VGS), it was announced, was to be amalgamated into 621 VGS, with the resultant formation retaining the designation 621 VGS.

In April 2014 a decision was made by 2FTS to pause Air Cadet gliding whilst an "Airworthiness Issue" was resolved. It soon became apparent that this wasn't going to be a quick fix. This came in the middle of an Easter Gliding Scholarship Course and would be the last time the squadron operated from Hullavington airfield.

The MOD sold Hullavington Airfield to Dyson for conversion to an industrial use. The MOD therefore needed to find a new location for the VGS. In March 2016 the future of Air Cadet gliding was announced in Parliament. 17 of the 27 VGS were to be disbanded – 621 VGS survived. The squadron kit was moved into storage at RAF Little Rissington, at the time, home of 637 VGS, by the end of 2016.

=== RAF Little Rissington 2016–present ===
Following the sale of Hullavington Airfield, 621 VGS were ordered to relocate at RNAS Merryfield, however, due to complications this was not possible. Thus, subsequently 621 VGS were ordered to relocate to RAF Little Rissington alongside 637 VGS, who had also survived the cuts and became home to remaining staff from several other disbanded Vigilant units, with 621 VGS operating alongside to embed 621 VGS's knowledge of winch launch operations to 637 VGS, whilst a more permanent home was found. Aircraft finally arrived in February 2017 and flying commenced.

In October 2018 it was confirmed that 621 VGS would be based permanently at RAF Little Rissington alongside 637 VGS and that the OC, Sqn Ldr Dave Woolcock MBE, would stand down at the end of the year.

== Operations ==
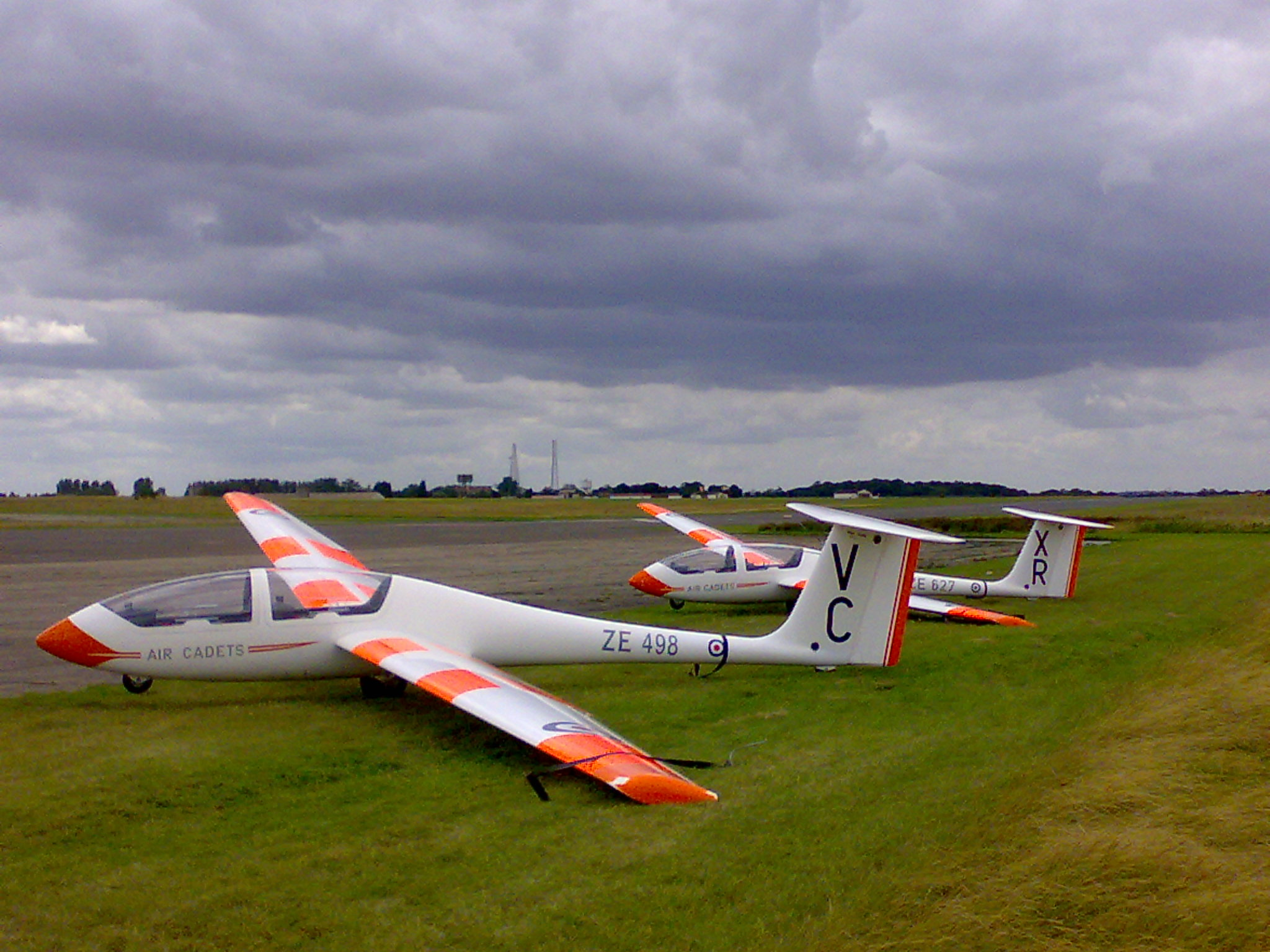
Vikings ZE498 (VC) and ZE627 (XR)

At the end of 2018 Sqn Ldr A. Webb took over command of 621 VGS from Sqn Ldr D Woolcock, since this the Squadron has undergone major changes in organisation and in personnel.

=== Squadron Headquarters ===
The Squadron is now based alongside 637 VGS in a converted Fire-station and tower used during previous operations at RAF Little Rissington. During this time much work has been done by the MOD and the Squadron to bring the building and the facilities up to scratch, including a fully compliant aircraft hangar, accommodation and an aircrew feeder.

=== Airfield information ===
The Squadron operates off of all three 'hard' runways and three grass strips running along each of the 'hard' surfaces at RAF Little Rissington. These are currently in varying states of repair, and not suitable for powered use.

=== Equipment ===
The Squadron currently operates numerous pieces of equipment to support its gliding operations at RAF Little Rissington. The squadron operates "White Fleet" vehicles as opposed to Green Fleet. This including Ford Rangers and a Deutz Fahr Tractor. The winches that the Squadron operates have just been upgraded from the Van Gelder Six Drum Trailer variant to the Skylaunch 2 Evo, this enabling launches to be carried out each time the cables are towed from the winch.

=== Organisation ===
The Squadron is currently organised in much the same manner as it has been for decades. The executives are made up of six established posts: Commanding Officer, Chief Flying Instructor, Adjutant, Technical Officer, Training Officer, Equipment Officer and the new post of Chief Ground Instructor. These are then supplemented by further posts to support them i.e. Flight Safety Officer.

=== Flights ===
The Squadron currently operates approximately between 110 and 130 days a year, depending on meteorological conditions. Operations are organised each day by the Duty Instructor and overseen by the VGSDE (Volunteer Gliding Squadron Duty Executive).

== Aircraft operated ==
- Slingsby Sedbergh TX.1 194?–1983
- Slingsby Prefect TX.1 195?–19??
- Slingsby Grasshopper TX.1 194?–19??
- Slingsby Cadet TX.2 195?–1983
- Slingsby Cadet TX.3 195?–1983
- Grob Viking TX.1 1983–present
