= No. 2 Flying Training School RAF =

Flying Training School of the Royal Air Force

No. 2 Flying Training School
- School Badge
- Active: 1920–1933; 1934–1939; 1939–1942; 1947–1952; 1953–1966; 1966–1970; 1970–1974; 1976–1997; 2014 – present
- Country: United Kingdom
- Branch: Royal Air Force
- Type: Flying training school
- Role: Glider training
- Part of: Royal Air Force Air Cadets
- Headquarters: RAF Syerston
- Mottos: Verbum sat Sapienti (Latin for 'A word to the wise is sufficient')
- Aircraft: Grob Viking T1

Commanders
- Current commander: Group Captain Barry "Baz" Dale
- Notable commanders: Arthur Tedder, 1st Baron Tedder

No.2 Flying Training School is a Flying Training School (FTS) of the Royal Air Force (RAF). It is part of No. 22 (Training) Group that delivers glider flying training to the Royal Air Force Air Cadets. Its headquarters is located at RAF Syerston in Nottinghamshire and gliding takes places from several sites throughout the UK using the Grob Viking T1. The RAF Central Gliding School is also under its command.

Throughout its history, No. 2 FTS has had various roles including being the first military flying school to use jet-powered aircraft throughout pilot training.

== History ==
=== First formation (1920) ===
No. 2 Flying Training School (FTS) was formed at RAF Duxford in Cambridgeshire as part of No. 3 Group on 26 April 1920, from No. 31 Training Squadron. The school had a special flight attached to it to carry out research for the Professor of Aeronautical Services at University of Cambridge. At the end of August 1921 the school was transferred to No. 1 Group, but returned to No. 3 Group on 1 July 1923. Initially equipped with Avro 504Ks and 504Ns for basic training, it used Airco DH.9As, Bristol F.2Bs and Sopwith Snipes for service training. The 504s were eventually replaced by Avro Tutors, while Armstrong Whitworth Siskins and Gloster Grebes replaced the Snipes. The school moved to RAF Digby in Lincolnshire on 30 June 1924, but ceased operations on 29 July 1933 and disbanded on 15 December of that year.

=== Second formation (1934) ===
The school reformed on 1 October 1934 as part of No. 23 Group at its previous home of RAF Digby, now equipped with Tutors for basic training and Hawker Harts & Furies for the service training phase. In 1936, Hawker Audaxes were added and in September 1937 the school moved to RAF Brize Norton in Oxfordshire, to move it away from the likely area of operations in the event of a war. By August 1939, basic flying training was being carrying out at civilian run Elementary and Reserve Flying Training Schools and the FTSs were concentrating on the service flying phase of training. To that end it was equipped with Harvards and Airspeed Oxfords.

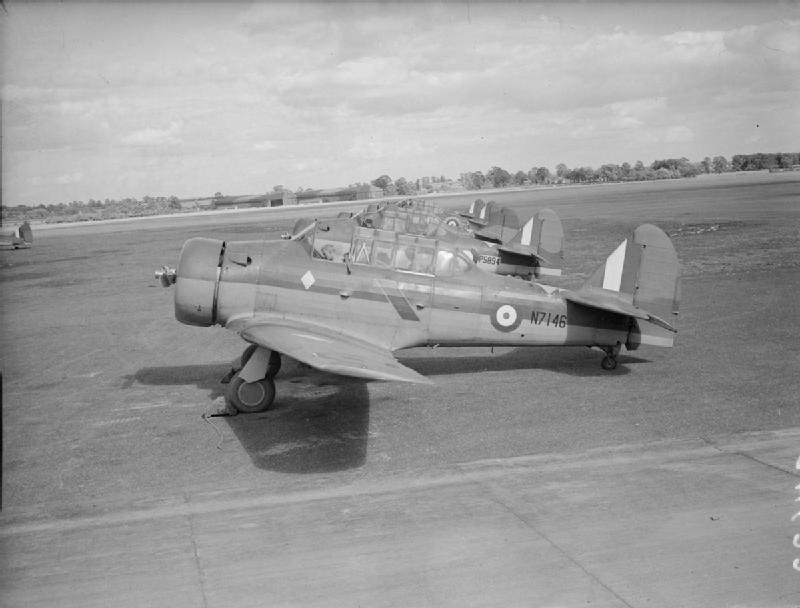
A lineup of Harvard trainers of No. 2 Service Flying Training School at RAF Brize Norton

With the outbreak of the Second World War on 3 September 1939, the school's title was changed to No. 2 Service Flying Training School (SFTS) and on 24 June 1940 it was reclassified as a Group II school concentrating on twin engined training with Oxfords. By 1942 the Commonwealth Air Training Plan was in full swing and most aircrew were being trained up to SFTS level in Canada, South Africa or Southern Rhodesia, before arriving in or returning to the UK. It was therefore decided to convert the SFTSs to (Pilot) or (Observer) Advanced Flying Units. These units would concentrate on training personnel arriving from overseas in the techniques and conditions of flying in a blacked-out northern Europe. As a result, No. 2 SFTS became No. 2 (Pilots') Advanced Flying Unit on 14 March 1942.

=== Third formation (1947) ===
On 23 July 1947, No. 20 FTS at RAF Church Lawford was re-designated No. 2 FTS and on 6 April 1948 it moved to RAF South Cerney in Gloucestershire. It was equipped with de Havilland Tiger Moths and Harvards but in June 1949 the Tiger Moths were replaced by Percival Prentices. However, the school did not last long as it was re-designated as Central Flying School (Basic) on 1 May 1952.

History of 20 FTS

No. 20 FTS was formed on 10 July 1940 at RAF Cranborne in Southern Rhodesia as No. 20 Service FTS and disbanded there during April 1945. The unit was reformed at Church Lawford, England as 20 FTS on 3 April 1945 but was renamed 2 SFTS on 4 September 1946.

=== Fourth & Fifth formations (1953 and 1970) ===
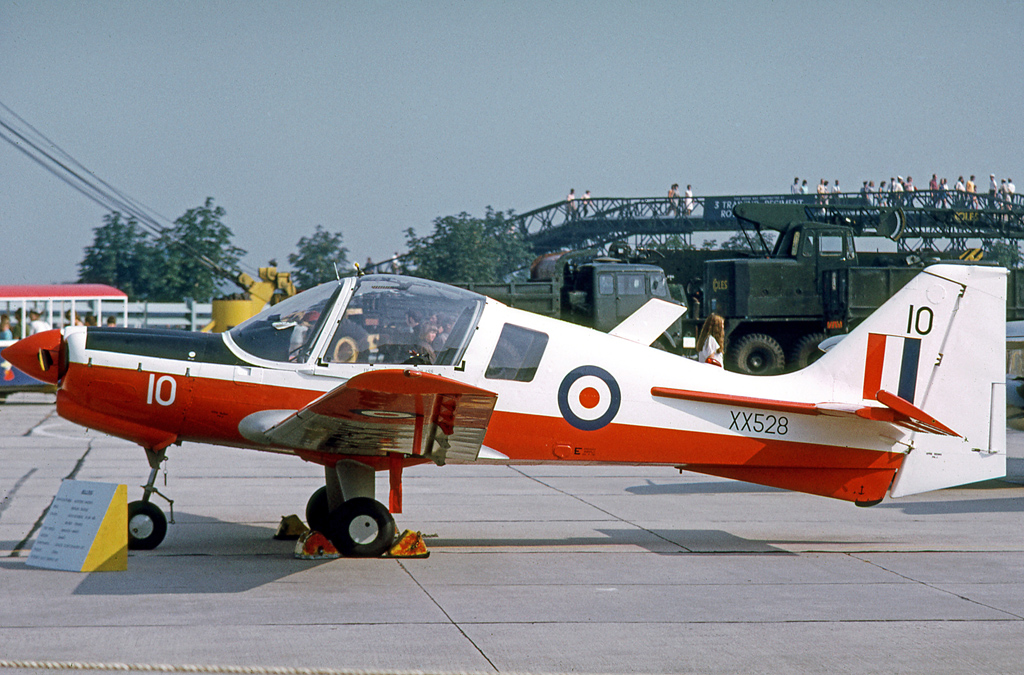
Scottish Aviation Bulldog of No. 2 FTS RNEFTS displayed at RNAS Yeovilton in 1973

As a result of the Korean War there was an increase in demand for pilots and No. 2 FTS re-formed on 1 March 1953 at RAF Cluntoe in Northern Ireland, with Prentices and Harvards. It moved to RAF Hullavington in Wiltshire on 1 June 1954, equipped with Percival Provosts and Chipmunks.

In 1955, it became the first school in the world to offer ab-initio training on jet aircraft when it introduced the Hunting Percival Jet Provost T.1 to a selected group of students. The experiment led the way to the introduction of the Jet Provost to all RAF flying training schools. On 18 November 1957, the school moved to RAF Syerston in Nottinghamshire and in December of that year was renamed No. 2 (Basic) Flying Training School, until it disbanded on 16 January 1970. However, the same day the Primary Flying School at RAF Church Fenton was renamed No. 2 FTS. Equipped with Chipmunks, a Bulldog section was added in 1973 which operated as the Royal Navy Elementary Flying Training School (RNEFTS). No. 2 FTS disbanded on 2 December 1974, although the RNEFTS transferred to the control of No. 1 FTS at RAF Linton-on-Ouse.

=== Sixth formation (1976) ===
On 31 March 1976, the school was reformed as No. 2 (Advanced) Flying Training School at RAF Ternhill in Shropshire, to provide advanced training to helicopter pilots. On 8 October 1976, it moved to nearby RAF Shawbury to become No. 2 FTS once again, where it took over control of the Central Air Traffic Control School RAF as well as continuing to train helicopter pilots and crewman at both basic and advanced levels.

On 30 March 1997, No. 2 FTS was disbanded and was replaced at Shawbury by the Defence Helicopter Flying School, which now trains helicopter pilots for all three British armed services.

=== Seventh formation (2014) ===
The school reformed at RAF Syerston on 31 January 2014 and took control of the RAF's Volunteer Gliding Squadrons (VGS) and the Central Gliding School (CGS), previously part of No. 3 Flying Training School.

Location of RAF Volunteer Gliding Squadrons

In April 2014, three months after reforming, all gliding operations were 'paused' due to airworthiness concerns with the Grob Viking T1 conventional glider and Grob Vigilant T1 motorglider. Almost two years later, on 10 March 2016, the Ministry of Defence (MOD) announced it would relaunch and drastically reduce gliding provision within the Air Cadet Organisation. The MOD's relaunch was heavily criticised. The nationwide fleet is to be reduced to 73 Viking TX1s and 15 Vigilant T1s, from a former total of 146 aircraft. The VGS listed below disbanded between 2016 and 2018.

- No. 611 VGS – RAF Honington
- No. 612 VGS – Dalton Barracks
- No. 613 VGS – RAF Halton
- No. 616 VGS – RAF Henlow
- No. 618 VGS – RAF Odiham
- No. 624 VGS – RMB Chivenor
- No. 631 VGS – RAF Woodvale
- No. 633 VGS – RAF Cosford
- No. 634 VGS – MOD St. Athan
- No. 635 VGS – RAF Topcliffe
- No. 636 VGS – Swansea Airport
- No. 642 VGS – RAF Linton-on-Ouse
- No. 663 VGS – Kinloss Barracks
- No. 664 VGS – Newtownards
- No. 662 VGS – RM Condor

It was anticipated that the relaunched Vigilants would be disposed of in October 2019, however this was brought forward and the Vigilant was retired from service on 5 May 2018, leaving the Viking T1 as the RAF's only glider aircraft.

Headquarters No. 2 FTS was heavily criticised for not communicating the plans to withdraw the Vigilant T1 from service and the restructuring resulting in closure of many volunteer gliding squadrons. Criticism was also voiced with respect to its retention policy of volunteer personnel, management of its contracted maintenance organization, failure to achieve continued airworthiness management organisation approval during two years of non-flying, limited recovery of aircraft, and the approach for acquiring Part Task Trainers with grants from the RAF Charitable Trust.

During 2017, No. 621 VGS & No. 637 VGS at Little Rissington, No. 644 VGS at Syerston and No. 645 VGS at Topcliffe returned to flying.

By February 2019, seven VGS had returned to flight (No. 621 ,622, 632, 637, 644, 645, and 661). The remaining three squadrons, No. 614, 615 and 626, are awaiting return to flight, but continue to train cadets on ground school elements and Part Task Trainers.

No. 621 VGS and No. 637 VGS were disbanded in 2024 and replaced by a reformed No. 612 VGS at Little Rissington.

== Role and operations ==
No. 2 Flying Training School provides glider training to RAF Air Cadets through several Volunteer Gliding Squadrons located throughout the UK.

The Central Gliding School teaches qualified gliding instructors who will go on to teach students within a VGS. The CGS also maintains instructor standards. CGS provide instructor training and standardisation both from their base at RAF Syerston and on visits to squadrons. The RAF Central Gliding School is co-located with HQ No. 2 FTS and the Gliding Examining Wing of the Central Flying School.

=== Command ===
No. 2 Flying Training School is part of the RAF Air Cadets (RAFAC) within No. 22 Training Group.

The unit is commanded by a Group Captain in Full Time Reserve Service (FTRS), the first full-time flying appointment given to an officer of that rank.

== Component units ==
As of November 2025, No. 2 Flying Training School comprises the following units:

- Central Gliding School – RAF Syerston
- No. 611 Volunteer Gliding Squadron – RAF Honington
- No. 612 Volunteer Gliding Squadron – Little Rissington Airfield
- No. 615 Volunteer Gliding Squadron – Kenley Airfield
- No. 622 Volunteer Gliding Squadron – Trenchard Lines
- No. 626 Volunteer Gliding Squadron – RNAS Predannack
- No. 632 Volunteer Gliding Squadron – Ternhill Airfield
- No. 644 Volunteer Gliding Squadron – RAF Syerston
- No. 645 Volunteer Gliding Squadron – RAF Topcliffe
- No. 661 Volunteer Gliding Squadron – RAF Kirknewton

== See also ==
- List of Royal Air Force schools
