= RAF Hullavington =

Former Royal Air Force station in Wiltshire, England

RAF Hullavington
- Near Hullavington, Wiltshire in England
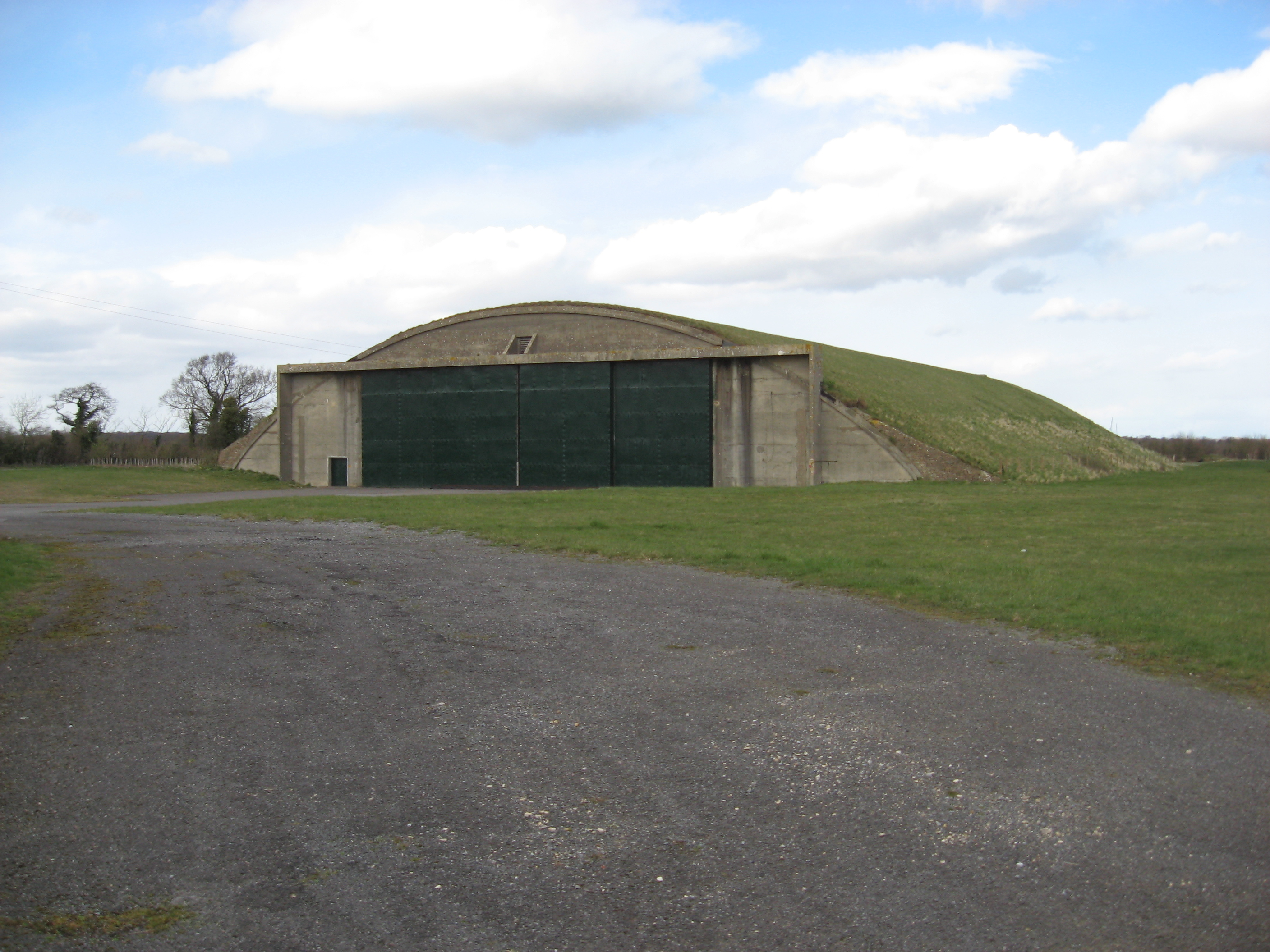
- Former hangar at RAF Hullavington

Site information
- Type: Royal Air Force flying station
- Owner: Ministry of Defence
- Operator: Royal Air Force
- Condition: Closed

Location
- Location in Wiltshire
- Coordinates: 51°31′30″N 002°08′00″W

Site history
- Built: 1937
- In use: 1937–1993
- Fate: Technical site transferred to the British Army and became Buckley Barracks.; Airfield part of the site continued to be used for RAF gliding operations and was known as Hullavington Airfield until 2016 when it was sold to technology company Dyson.

Airfield information
- Identifiers: ICAO: EGDV, WMO: 03637
- Elevation: 104 metres (341 ft) AMSL
Runways
Direction	Length and surface
06/14	1,070 metres (3,510 ft) Asphalt
06/15	1,250 metres (4,101 ft) Asphalt

Royal Air Force Hullavington, or more simply RAF Hullavington, (ICAO: EGDV) was a Royal Air Force station located at Hullavington, near Chippenham, Wiltshire, England. The station opened in June 1937 and was primarily used for training. It closed on 31 March 1992 when it was transferred to the British Army and renamed Buckley Barracks. The airfield part of the site, known as Hullavington Airfield, continued to be used for RAF gliding operations until 2016 when it was sold to technology company Dyson.

== History ==
The site spans three parishes: the hangars and grassland in the north and west lie in Hullavington parish, while other hangars, most of the runways and the northern part of the barracks are in St Paul Malmesbury Without. The rest of the barracks are in Stanton St Quintin parish and are near the small village of Lower Stanton St Quintin and the A429 Chippenham-Malmesbury road.

The airfield was opened on 14 June 1937 with No 9 Flying Training School arriving from RAF Thornaby on 10 July. Leonard Cheshire V.C. trained here in 1939. With the beginning of the Second World War, top officers from allied nations came to Hullavington to share ideas and methods. Ten Blenheims from No 114 Squadron arrived at the base on 1 September 1939, and were later joined by seven from No 139 Squadron. This was a safety move as a sustained attack was expected at the East Anglian bomber bases on the announcement of war. As this didn't happen, all the Blenheims departed Hullavington by 16 September 1939. An effective Met. Office was also stationed at Hullavington, and an aircraft left every day at dawn to gather weather data at various altitudes.

In 1970, RAF Hullavington hosted the World Aerobatic Championships.

In 1992, the entire airfield was designated a conservation area. English Heritage (now Historic England) later stated that "It embodies, to a unique degree, the improved architectural quality associated with the post-1934 expansion of the RAF. Most of the original buildings have survived and form a particularly coherent and well-ordered ensemble." Grade II listed buildings include the officers' mess and the church.

In 1993, a Senior Aircraftman was convicted of arson and sent to jail for 5 years and his accomplice received a fine of £1000. The hangar was the location of all the parachutes for the armed services, and the damage and loss of stock affected morale at the base.

=== Units posted to the station ===
The station has performed many roles, summarised with dates below.

==== Royal Air Force ====
- No. 9 (Pilot) Advanced Flying Unit RAF between June 1937 and July 1942.
- No. 9 Maintenance Unit RAF between 8 July 1938 and 31 December 1959 (renamed No. 10 MU during February 1939) as an Aircraft Storage Unit with Airspeed Oxfords and Avro Ansons.
- No. 10 Group Communications Flight was formed here on 1 June 1940 and used multiple aircraft types.
- No. 88 Gliding School disbanded here during May 1948.
- No. 114 Squadron RAF was reformed here on 20 November 1958 with the de Havilland Canada DHC-1 Chipmunk T.10 and stayed until 15 December 1958 when the squadron moved to RAF Nicosia.
- No. 621 Volunteer Gliding Squadron (VGS) between 1993 and 2015, when it transferred to RAF Little Rissington.
- No. 625 Volunteer Gliding Squadron (VGS) between 1992 and 2013.
- No. 1532 BAT Flight.
- Balloon Operations Squadron (1950s-31 March 1995) (The end of military ballooning in the UK)
- Bristol University Air Squadron.
- Empire Central Flying School between 1 April 1942 and 7 May 1946.
- Empire Flying School between 7 May 1946 and 31 July 1949.
- Parachute Support Unit.
- Primary Flying Squadron.
- No. 1 Air Navigation School was disbanded here on 1 May 1954.
- No. 2 Flying Training School with the Hunting Percival Provost T.1 between May 1954 and 1957.
- Air Electronics School between 1957 and 1962.
- No. 2 Air Navigation School between 1962 and 15 September 1965, when it transferred to RAF Gaydon.
- No. 16 Parachute Heavy Drop Company Royal Army Ordnance Corps from 1971 until it disbanded 1 September 1976.
- Parachute Packing Unit/Parachute Servicing Flight between 1967 and 1992.
- No. 4626 (Aeromedical Evacuation) Squadron RAuxAF between 1986 and 1995.

==== Royal Air Force Regiment ====
- No. 5 Wing RAF Regiment between 1982 and 1990.
- No. II Squadron RAF Regiment between 1981 and 1996.
- No. 15 Squadron RAF Regiment from 1983 until RAF Hullavington was closed to the RAF in 1996.

==== Air Transport Auxiliary ====
- No. 8 Ferry Pilot Pool between November 1940 and March 1941.
- No. 1427 (Ferry Training) Flight between 18 May and 5 September 1942.

=== Defence Codification Data Centre ===
The Defence Codification Data Centre (DCDC) lodged in a purpose-built computer suite at RAF Hullavington from its establishment in 1966 until its dispersal to Glasgow in 1986, where it merged with its parent body, the Defence Codification Authority.

== Closure and post RAF use ==
RAF Hullavington formally closed on 31 March 1993.

=== Buckley Barracks ===
The technical site part of the station was transferred to the British Army and became known as Hullavington Barracks. In 2003, it was renamed Buckley Barracks after the Victoria Cross winner John Buckley. The barracks are home to 9 Regiment Royal Logistic Corps.

=== Hullavington Airfield ===
The airfield part of the site was retained by the RAF and was known as Hullavington Airfield. In 1992 and 1993 two Volunteer Gliding Schools (VGS) moved in, operating the Viking, a modified version of the civilian Grob 103. During 2013, No. 621 VGS and No. 625 VGS merged to form No. 621 VGS. As of 1 September 2016, it was announced by 621 VGS Historical Flight that there would be no further flying from Hullavington.

In 2016, the UK Government announced that the airfield was one of twelve that would be sold as part of the strategy for the Ministry of Defence estate. The site was sold to the technology company Dyson, which has headquarters nearby at Malmesbury. In March 2017, Dyson submitted plans to convert two 1940s hangars into a research and development centre. By August 2018, four hundred staff were engaged on automotive development at the site and the company planned to create a ten-mile car test track; however, in October 2019 the project was abandoned. The company intended to use the Hullavington site to manufacture medical ventilators during the COVID-19 pandemic but the UK government cancelled their order in April 2020.

Hangar 88 is currently used by M4 Karting.
