= Slingsby Falke =

British / German motor glider, 1971

T.61 Falke
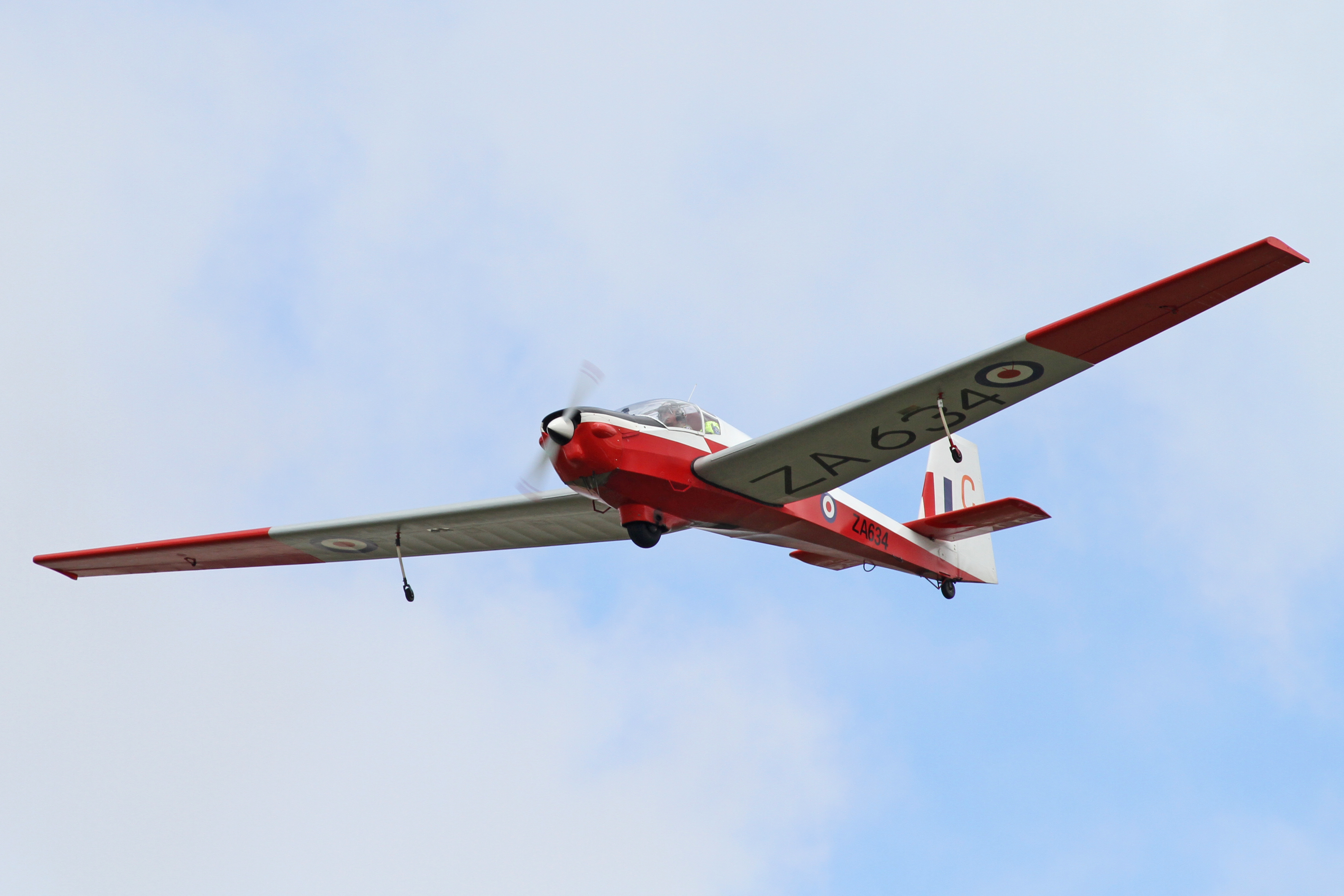
- T61F Venture T2

General information
- Type: Basic Trainer
- National origin: United Kingdom
- Manufacturer: Slingsby Sailplanes
- Primary user: Royal Air Force
- Number built: 76

History
- First flight: 1971
- Developed from: Scheibe SF 25B

The Slingsby Type 61 Falke was a licence-built version of the Scheibe SF 25B Motor glider built by Slingsby Sailplanes. It entered service with the Royal Air Force for air cadet training as the Slingsby Venture.

== Development ==
In 1970 Slingsby acquired a licence to build the SF 25B as the Type 61A Falke, a side-by-side two-seat dual training monoplane. This first variant was powered by a 45 hp Starck Stamo MS1500 engine and first flew at Wombleton on 8 February 1971. During May 1971 one aircraft was evaluated by the Royal Air Force as the Venture T1 and an order for 15 aircraft followed. The aircraft were to be operated by Volunteer Gliding Schools for basic air cadet training. Following replacement by the Grob Vigilant T1 they were all sold in 1990.

== Variants ==
T61A
Production variant fitted with a Starck Stamo MS1500 engine with manual engine start, 26 built.
T61B
As T61A but fitted with a Franklin 2A-120-A engine, one built.
T61C
Production variant fitted with a Starck Stamo MS1500 engine with an electric engine start, 8 built.
T61D
One T61A refitted with Rollason R.S.1 engine in 1972.
T61E
Production aircraft for the RAF as Venture T2, 15 built later modified to T61F.
T61F
Production aircraft for the RAF with electric engine starter as the Venture T2, 15 T61Es modified and 25 built.
T61G
One aircraft powered by a Limbach SL1700 engine.
Venture T1
RAF designation for one T61A bought for evaluation in 1971.
Venture T2
RAF designation for production T61E and later T61F aircraft.

== Former operators ==
United Kingdom

- Royal Air Force

RAF VGS 612 ZA652, ZA653, ZA654

RAF VGS 616 ZA625, ZA630

RAF VGS 642 XZ550 August 1978, XZ563 October 1978, ZA630 March 1980, ZA657, ZA659 replaced XZ653

RAF VGS 644 ZA634 29 March 1980.

== Specifications (T61A) ==
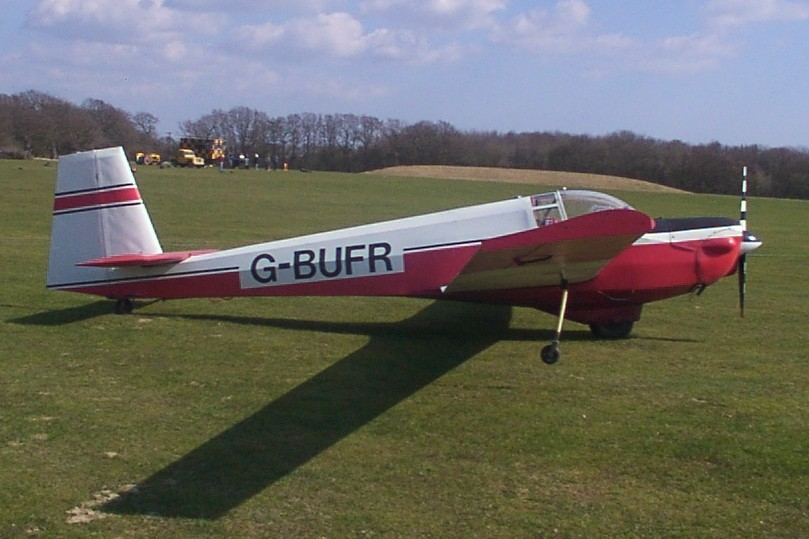
T61F Venture T2

General characteristics

- Crew: Two
- Length: 24 ft 11 in (7.6 m)
- Wingspan: 50 ft 4 in (15.33 m)
- Wing area: 188 sq ft (17.47 m^{2})
- Aspect ratio: 13.4
- Empty weight: 740 lb (335 kg)
- Gross weight: 1,170 lb (530 kg)
- Powerplant: 1 × Starck Stamo MS1500 , 45 hp (34 kW)

Performance

- Maximum glide ratio: 22
- Rate of sink: 200 ft/min (1.00 m/s)

== See also ==
- Air Training Corps

Related lists

- List of aircraft of the Royal Air Force
