= Central Gliding School =

- School badge
- Active: 9 August 1971 – present
- Country: United Kingdom
- Branch: Royal Air Force
- Type: Flying training school
- Role: Glider instructor training and flying training oversight
- Size: 50 personnel
- Part of: No. 2 Flying Training School
- Station: RAF Syerston
- Mottos: Doctrina nostra incitat (Latin for 'Our doctrine incites' / 'Our teaching encourages')
- Aircraft: Grob Viking T1

Commanders
- Current commander: Group Captain Baz Dale

The Central Gliding School (CGS) is the Royal Air Force's primary institution for the training of gliding instructors for the instruction of Royal Air Force and Air Cadet personnel. It is administered under No. 2 Flying Training School and is responsible for the standardisation of the Air Cadet gliding syllabus and its instructors.

== History ==
The Central Gliding school was formed on 9 August 1971 at RAF Spitalgate by merging No. 1 and No. 2 Gliding Centres. It was renamed the Air Cadet Central Gliding School in 1984. It delivered gliding instruction and air experience to Air Training Corps cadets. Gliding Instructors from the ACCGS were regulated and examined under direction of the RAF Central Flying School (CFS) at RAF Cranwell. ACCGS and CFS examiners carried out currency and competency checks annually on Volunteer Gliding Schools (VGS) and their instructors.

== Current operations ==
Instruction at CGS includes the delivery of Grade 2 (G2) and Grade 1 (G1) instructor training. The G2 course (approximately 4 months long) includes pilots seat conversion training, enabling the pilots to fly from both the front and back of the Viking T1. The Grade 1 syllabus allows pilots to conduct instructional sorties to cadets, and supervise flying above 500ft AGL (above ground level). G1 instructors are then allocated the ‘QGI’ (Qualified Gliding Instructor) qualification at RAF Syerston and are then able to deliver the Gliding Scholarship syllabus.
