= Slingsby Prefect =

British single-seat glider, 1948

Prefect
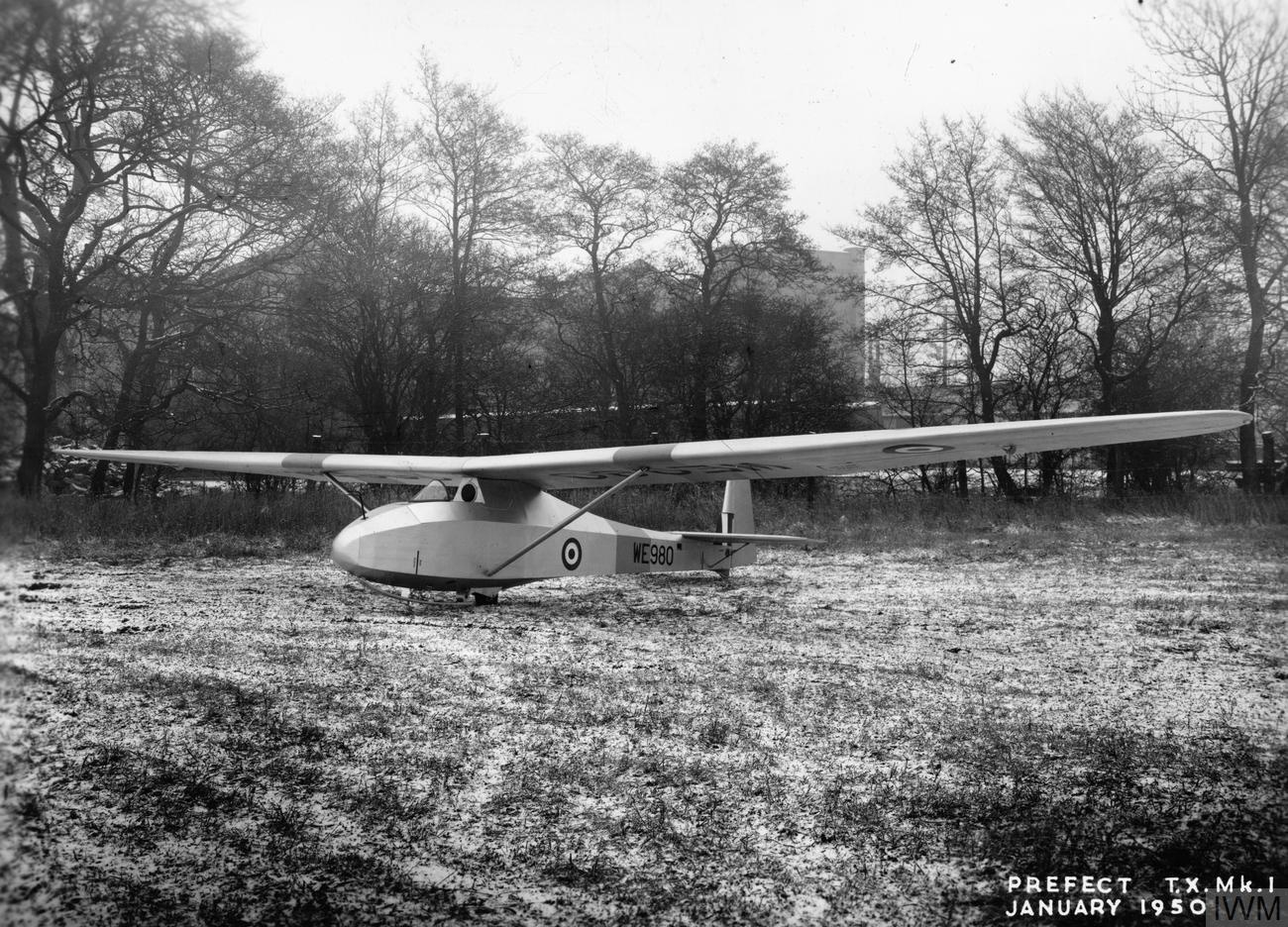
- Second production Prefect TX.1 WE980 in 1950.

General information
- Type: Intermediate training glider
- National origin: United Kingdom
- Manufacturer: Slingsby Sailplanes Ltd
- Primary user: Royal Air Force
- Number built: c.53

History
- First flight: June 1948
- Developed from: Grunau Baby

The Slingsby T.30 Prefect is a 1948 British modernisation of the 1932 single-seat Grunau Baby glider. About 53 were built for civil and military training purposes.

== Development ==
In 1948, Slingsby Sailplanes developed the 1932 Grunau Baby, which it had built under licence before World War II, into the Slingsby T.30 Prefect, an intermediate-level semi-aerobatic glider suitable for civil or military use. In the same year, Elliotts of Newbury introduced its version of the Grunau Baby, the Baby Eon; all three types were visually very similar, but differed slightly in dimensions, undercarriage, airbrakes, equipment and performance.

The Prefect, like the Grunau Baby, was a single-seat fabric-covered wooden glider. It had high-mounted semi-cantilever straight-tapered wings, with a single wing bracing strut on each side, from the base of the fuselage to the wing spar. The span was 150 mm (6 in) greater than that of the Grunau Baby, and the tips enclosed the outer ends of the ailerons. Mid-chord airbrakes were fitted just outboard of the wing strut ends, extending above and below the wing. The fuselage was flat sided, and tapered from the trailing edge of the wing to a very small fin bearing a large, aerodynamically-balanced and slightly reshaped rudder that extended down to the keel. The straight-tipped tailplane, mounted on the top of the fuselage and braced from below, had a strongly swept leading edge and was placed with its trailing edge at the fin's leading edge, so that the elevators lacked the large cut out for rudder movement seen on the earlier glider. The open cockpit was better enclosed at the sides and had a small windscreen; for access, the cockpit sides and windscreen were removed as a single piece. Slingsby also added a single-wheel undercarriage in addition to the earlier nose skid, placed below mid-chord.

In June 1948, the Prefect made its first flight. It was about 20 kg heavier than its predecessor, but despite a higher wing loading had a significantly better lift to drag ratio, 21 compared with 17.

== Operational history ==
The Prefect was sold both on the civil market, including the Royal Air Force Gliding & Soaring Association (RAFGSA), and to the Air Training Corps (ATC) as the Prefect TX.Mk.1. 46 Prefects were built by Slingsby, with sales in Belgium, the Netherlands, Egypt, Israel and New Zealand. The Royal Netherlands Aero Club had 9 of them. The ATC had 15 Prefects. In addition, Bedek Aircraft Ltd built about seven aircraft under licence in Israel. Some surviving ATC aircraft, originally bearing RAF serials, transferred to civil registry.

== Surviving aircraft ==
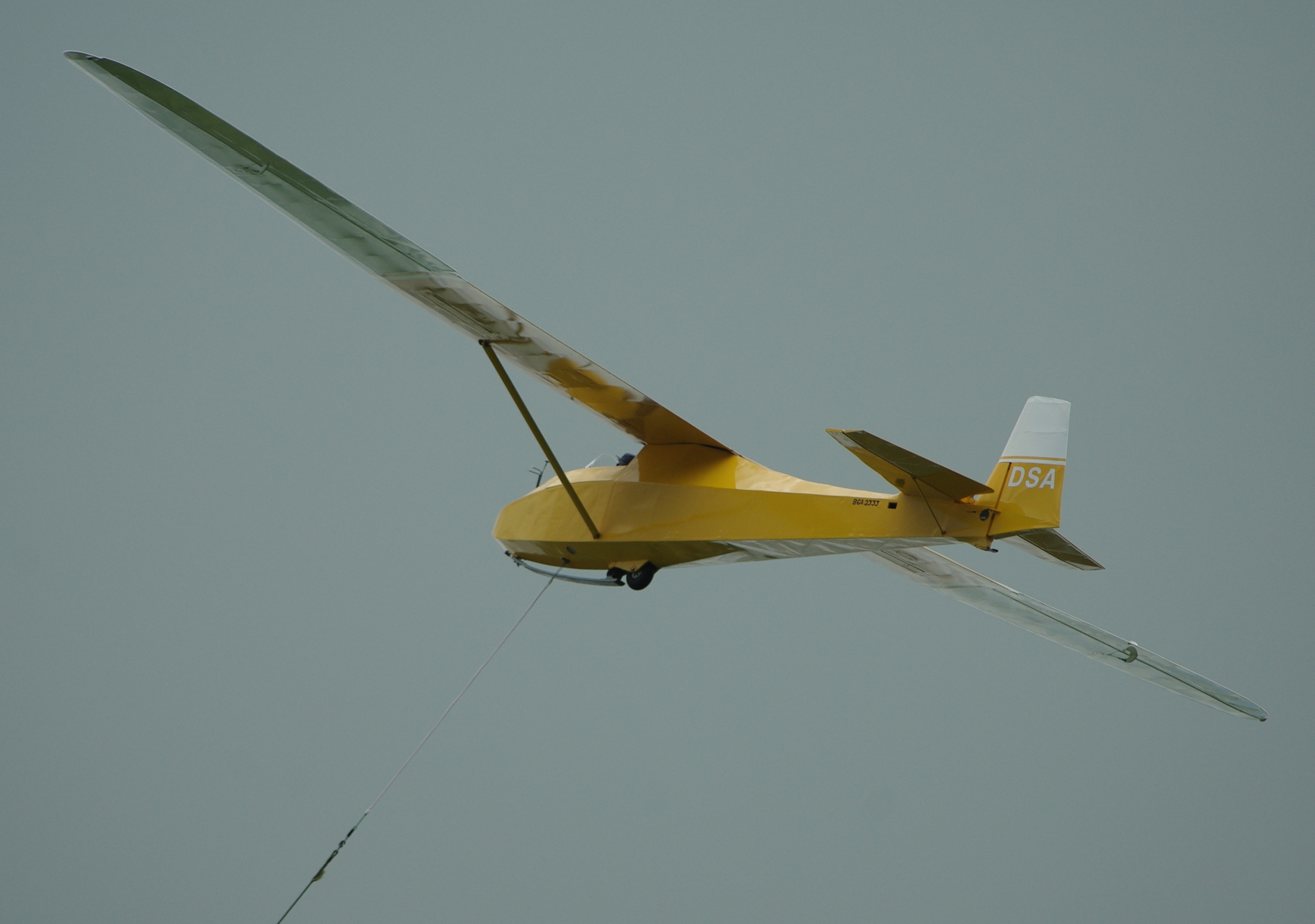
Prefect cable launch

At least fourteen Prefects still fly In 2019. These include the prototype in the UK (G-ALLF at Lasham heritage centre) and five other T30As in the Netherlands (PH-192,193,194,196,198). At Pentecost 4-6 june 2022 the dutch prefects were all at a meeting at gliding site Nistelrode(Netherlands), to celebrate their 70th anniversary, the dutch prefects are all build in 1951, and are flying in the Netherlands since 1952. Originally 8 planes, 5 are still surviving an airworthy.

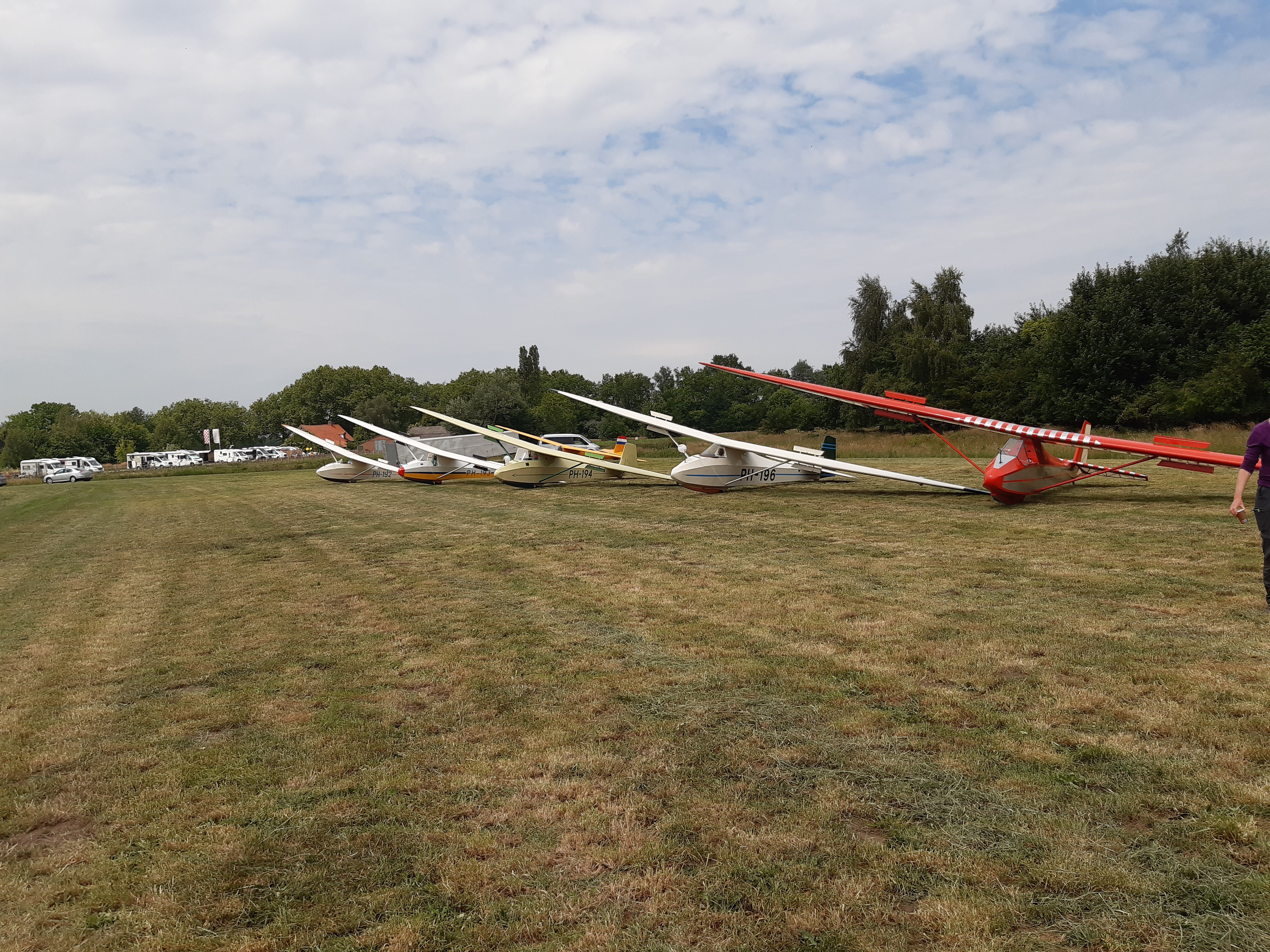

The rest are mostly ex-RAF production T30Bs, six in the UK, two in Germany and one in the Czech Republic. Another T30B is "extant" in Sweden but it is not known if it is airworthy.

== Aircraft on display ==
Prefects are on display at the South Yorkshire Aircraft Museum, at the old RAF Doncaster site, Gliding Heritage Centre and at Queenstown Airport, New Zealand.

== Specifications ==
Data from Ellison 1971, pp. 200, The World's Sailplanes:Die Segelflugzeuge der Welt:Les Planeurs du Monde

General characteristics

- Crew: 1
- Length: 21 ft 4 in (6.49 m)
- Wingspan: 45 ft 0 in (13.72 m)
- Wing area: 153.4 sq ft (14.25 m^{2})
- Aspect ratio: 13.2
- Airfoil: Gőttingen 535 at root, symmetric tip
- Empty weight: 390 lb (177 kg)
- Gross weight: 586 lb (266 kg)
- Max takeoff weight: 615 lb (279 kg)

Performance

- Stall speed: 30 kn (35 mph, 56 km/h)
- Never exceed speed: 90 kn (104 mph, 167 km/h)
- Rough air speed max: 65 kn (75 mph; 120 km/h)
- Aerotow speed: 60 kn (69 mph; 110 km/h)
- Winch launch speed: 50 kn (58 mph; 93 km/h)
- g limits: +5 -2.5 at 71 kn (82 mph; 131 km/h)
- Maximum glide ratio: 1:21 at 37 kn (43 mph; 69 km/h)
- Rate of sink: 165 ft/min (0.84 m/s) at 32 kn (37 mph; 59 km/h)
- Wing loading: 4.0 lb/sq ft (19.5 kg/m^{2})

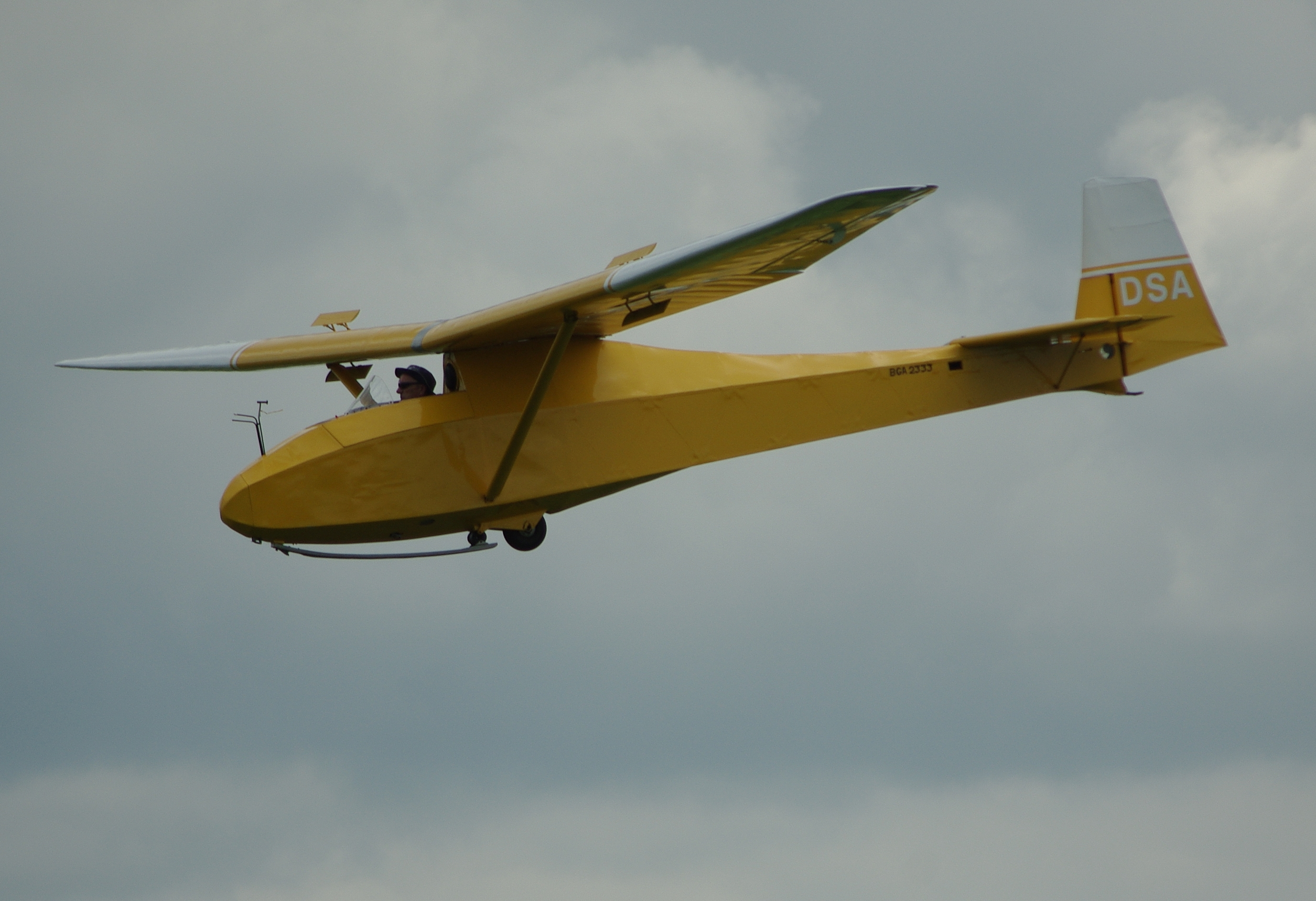
Prefect landing, airbrakes deployed

== See also ==
Aircraft of comparable role, configuration, and era

- Schneider Grunau Baby

Related lists

- List of gliders
