= No. 106 Squadron RAF =

Defunct flying squadron of the Royal Air Force

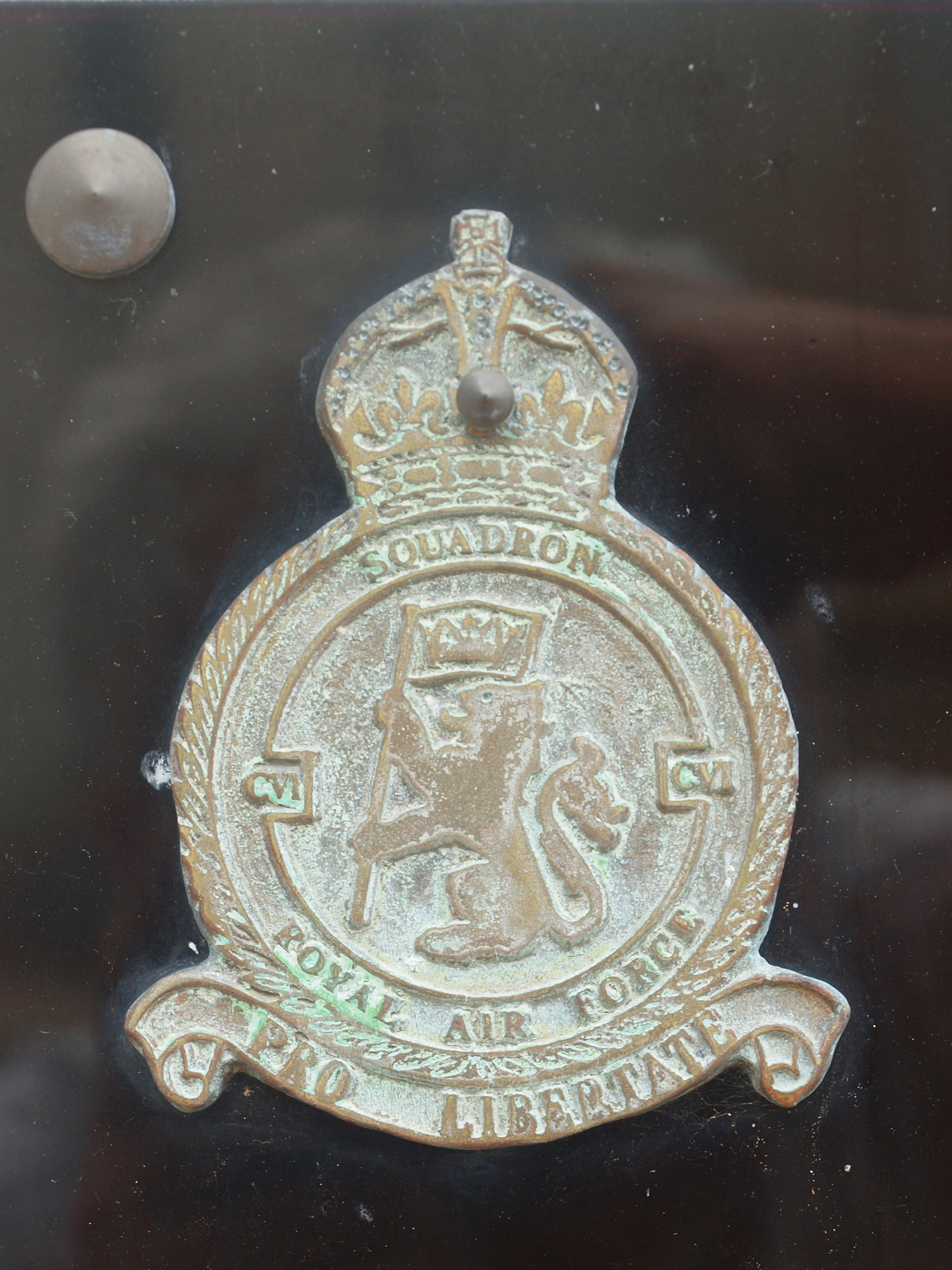
- No. 106 Squadron badge
- Active: 30 September 1917 – 8 February 1919; 1 June 1938 – 18 February 1946; 22 July 1959 – 24 May 1963
- Country: United Kingdom
- Branch: Royal Air Force
- Mottos: Latin: Pro Libertate ("For Freedom")

Commanders
- Notable commanders: Guy Gibson

Insignia
- Squadron Badge: A lion sejant, rampant, holding a banner charged with an astral crown. Based on the crest of the County Borough of Doncaster, the squadron being stationed near there at the time of adopting the badge.
- Squadron Codes: XS (May 1939 – September 1939); ZN (September 1939 – February 1946)

No. 106 Squadron RAF was a Royal Flying Corps and Royal Air Force squadron active from 1917 until 1919, throughout World War II and during the Cold War from 1959 until 1963.

== History ==
=== Establishment and early service ===
Formed as No. 106 Squadron RFC, at Andover, Hampshire, on 30 September 1917. It was initially intended to be a corps reconnaissance squadron but after training in May 1918 it was not sent to the Western Front but to Ireland to help with the developing troubles there. It served in army co-operation and policing roles for eighteen months before being disbanded at Fermoy, on 8 October 1919. The squadron next appeared in June 1938, when it was re-formed as No. 106 (Bomber) Squadron.

=== Reformation and World War II ===
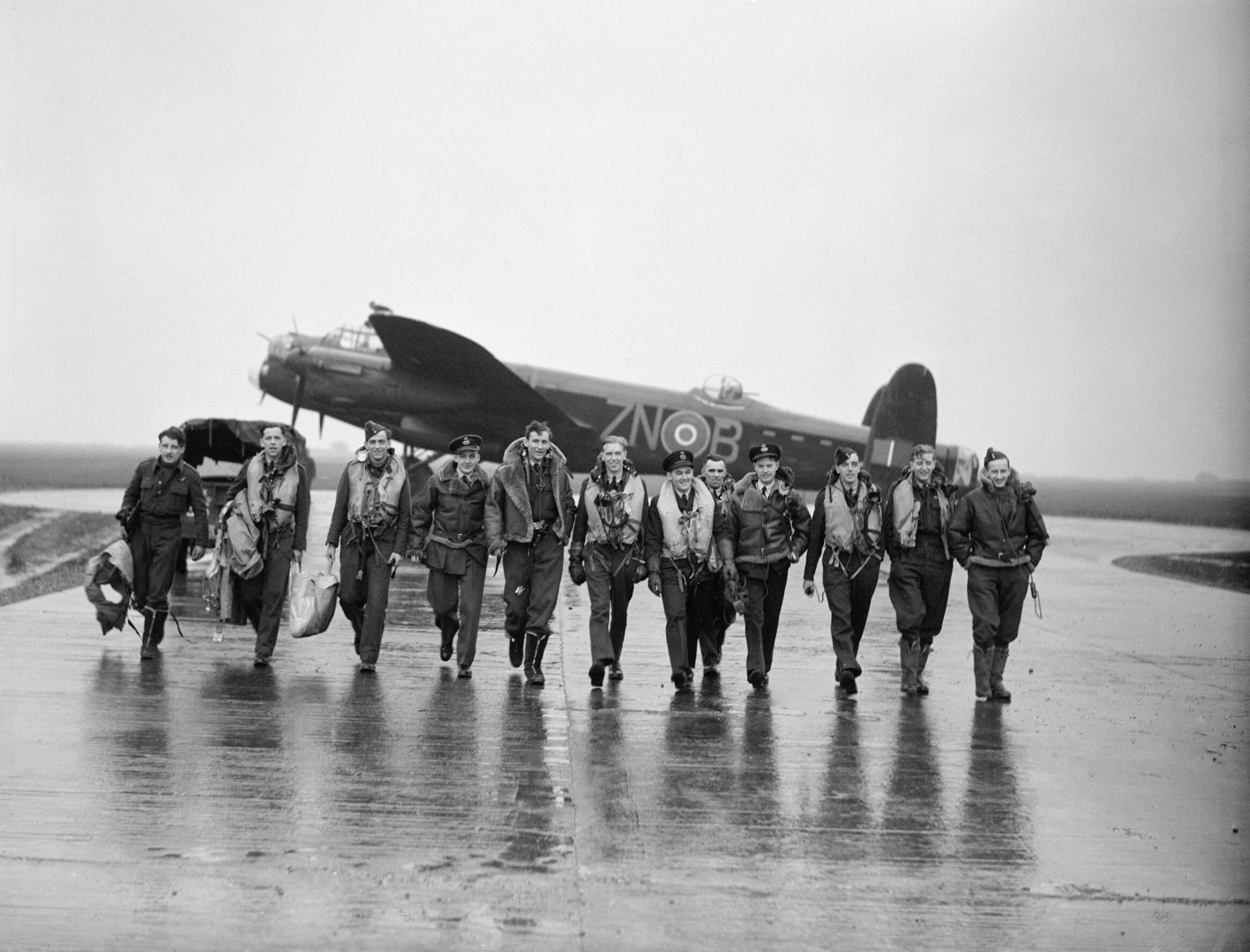
No. 106 Squadron Lancaster aircrew at RAF Syerston after raiding Genoa, October 1942

The squadron reformed on 1 June 1938 at RAF Abingdon from a nucleus provided by a flight from No. 15 Squadron. Initially equipped with Hawker Hinds, it began to receive Fairey Battles on 8 July before moving to No. 5 Group at RAF Thornaby on 1 September and, temporarily, moving to RAF Grantham on 26 September before returning to Thornaby on 14 October 1938. From May 1939 the squadron began re-equipping with Handley Page Hampdens together with Avro Ansons to assist in the conversion process. The squadron left RAF Thornaby on 19 August 1939 for armament training at RAF Evanton and, on 1 September, moved to RAF Cottesmore.

At the outbreak of the Second World War the squadron was flying Hampdens with No. 5 Group in a training role which continued up until 1 March 1941 when it reverted to front-line status and began regular night bombing operations against Fortress Europe, flying its first bombing raid on Cologne, although it had taken part in some minelaying prior to that.

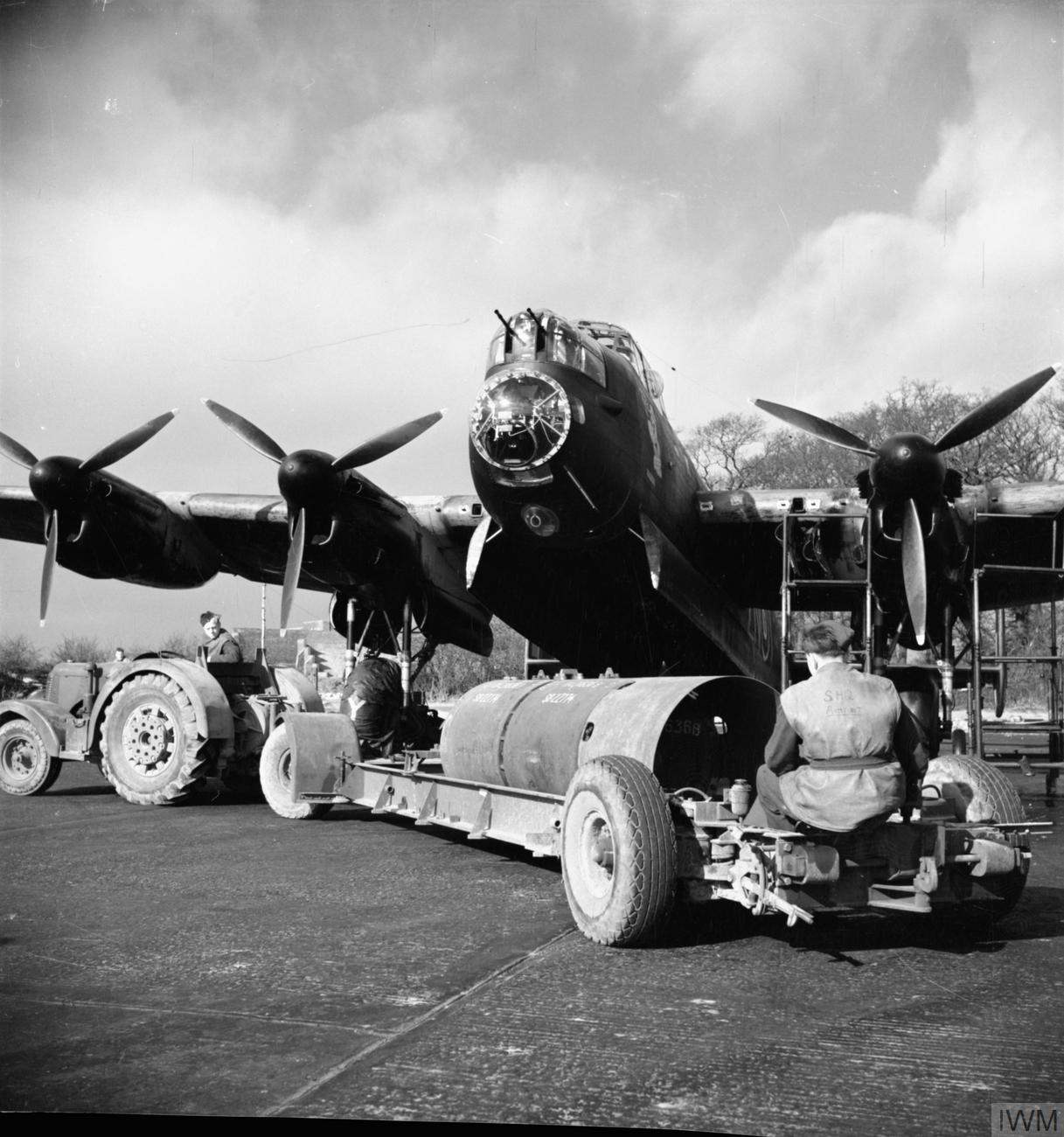
An 8,000-lb HC bomb ('super cookie') being loaded into a Lancaster of No. 106 Squadron at RAF Syerston, for an attack on Stuttgart

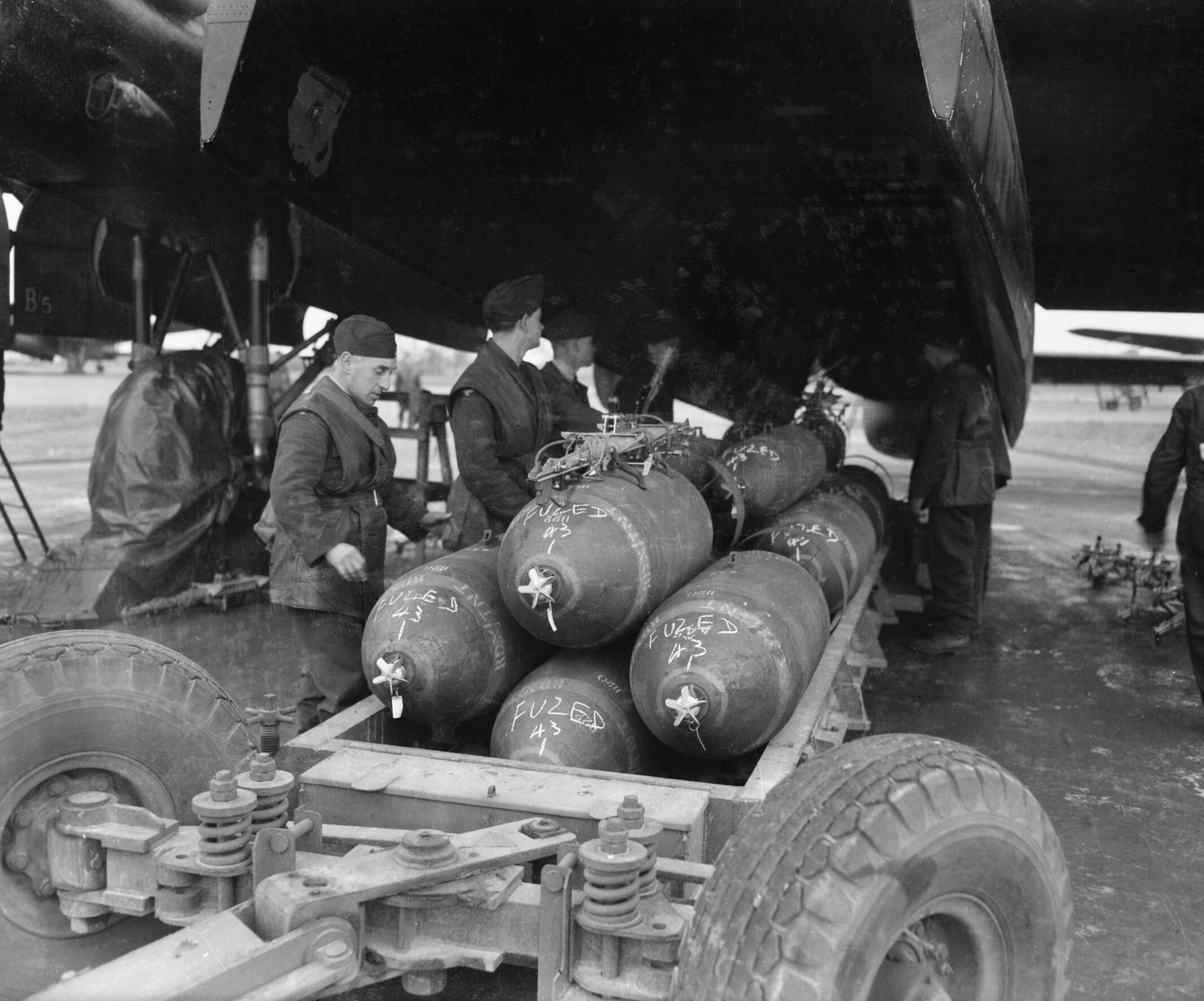
Armourers prepare to load 1,000-lb MC bombs into a No. 106 Squadron Lancaster at RAF Metheringham

After a short spell in early 1942 with Avro Manchesters, No. 106 Squadron started replacing them with Avro Lancasters in May, but it did not convert completely to Lancasters before some of the squadron's Manchesters had participated in the thousand-bomber raids on Cologne, Essen and Bremen during the summer of 1942. In October it contributed ten Lancasters to No. 5 Group's low-level epic dusk raid on the Schneider Works at Le Creusot and two more, one of them piloted by commanding officer Guy Gibson, to a subsidiary raid on Montchanin.

In June 1943 it took part in the first "shuttle bombing" raids on Friedrichshafen and La Spezia - code-named Operation Bellicose - and the famous attack against the V-2 rocket research facility at Peenemünde. Among the targets attacked in 1944 were a coastal gun battery at Saint-Pierre-du-Mont and the V-1 flying bomb storage sites in the caves at Saint-Leu-d'Esserent.

In December 1944, it made a 1,900-mile round trip to bomb the German Baltic Fleet at Gdynia, while in March 1945, it was represented in the bomber force that so pulverised the defences of Wesel just before the Rhine crossing that Commandos were able to seize the town with only 36 casualties. In April 1945, came the last of the squadron's operations of the war – a bombing raid on an oil refinery at Tønsberg in Norway, and a simultaneous minelaying expedition in the Oslofjord.

During World War II, No. 106 Squadron operated on 496 nights and 46 days, flying 5,834 operational sorties. In so doing it lost 187 aircraft – a percentage loss on sorties flown of 3.21 – but on the credit side its gunners claimed 20 enemy aircraft destroyed, 3 probably destroyed and 29 damaged. A total of 267 decorations were won by the squadron, including a Victoria Cross awarded to Sergeant Norman Cyril Jackson for conspicuous bravery during an attack on Schweinfurt on 26/27 April 1944.

After VE Day, No. 467 Squadron RAAF arrived at RAF Metheringham to train with No. 106 Squadron for the planned invasion of Japan but the end of the war made this redundant and the squadron was used to fly POWs and troops home, principally from Italian bases, until it finally disbanded at Metheringham on 18 Feb 1946.

=== Post war reformation ===
The squadron was reformed – as 106(SM) Sqn. – on 22 July 1959 as one of 20 Strategic Missile (SM) squadrons associated with Project Emily. The squadron was equipped with three PGM-17 Thor intermediate-range ballistic missiles and based at RAF Bardney. In October 1962, during the Cuban Missile Crisis, the squadron was kept at full readiness, with the missiles aimed at strategic targets in the USSR. The squadron was disbanded on 24 May 1963, with the termination of the Thor Program in Britain.

== Aircraft operated ==
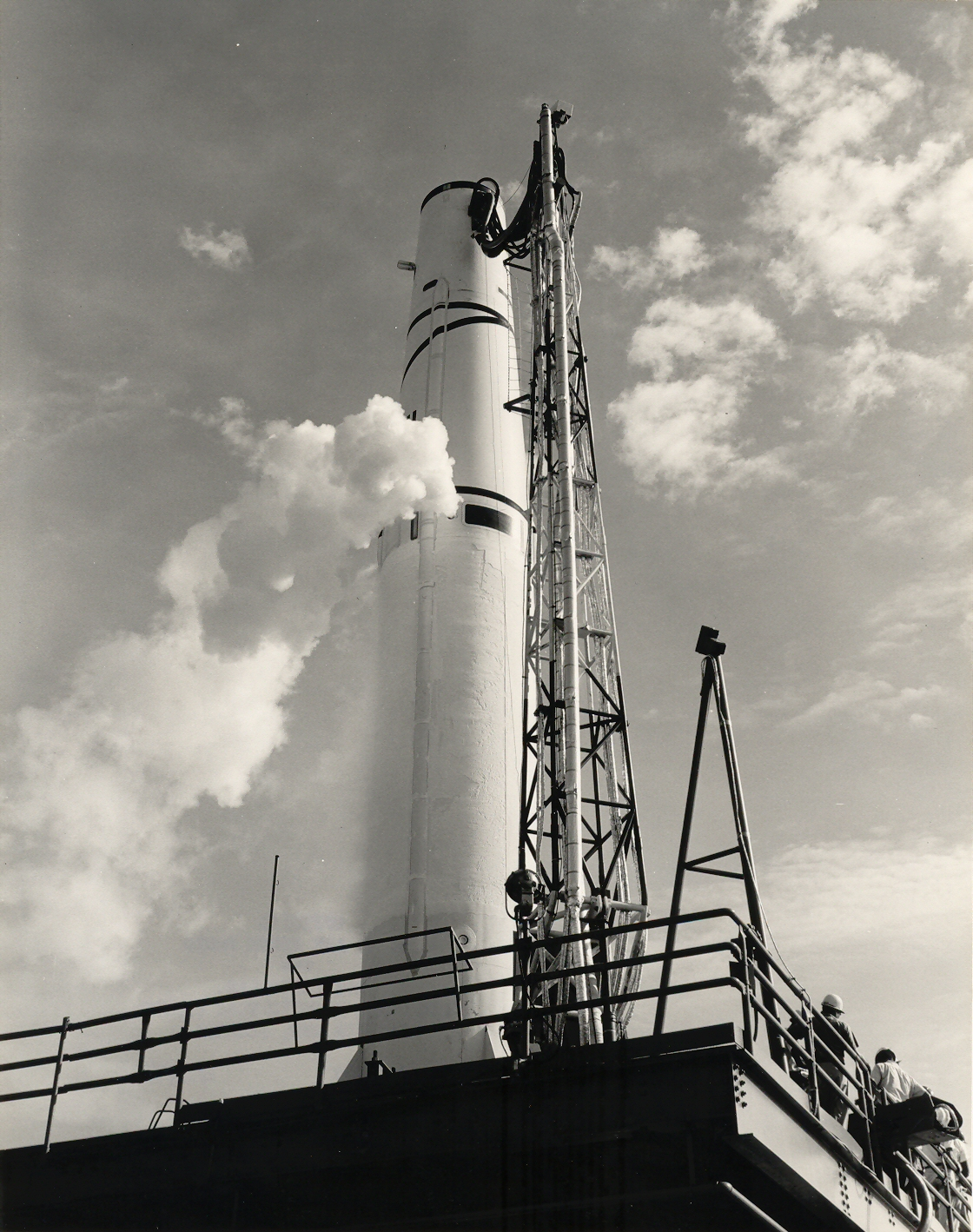
A Thor missile on the launching pad

From	To	Aircraft	Version
May 1918	January 1919	Royal Aircraft Factory R.E.8	
January 1919	October 1919	Bristol F2B Fighter	
June 1938	July 1938	Hawker Hind	
July 1938	June 1939	Fairey Battle	
May 1939	September 1939	Avro Anson	Mk.I
May 1939	March 1942	Handley Page Hampden	
March 1942	June 1942	Avro Manchester	
May 1942	February 1946	Avro Lancaster I & III	Mk.I & III
July 1959	May 1963	Thor IRBM	

Line drawings of aircraft operated

== Bomber Command World War II Bases ==
From	To	Station	Comments
September 1938	August 1939	RAF Thornaby	
August 1939	September 1939	RAF Evanton	Detached here in Aug 1939 and moved, early in Sep 1939
September 1939	October 1939	RAF Cottesmore	
October 1939	February 1941	RAF Finningley	
February 1941	September 1942	RAF Coningsby	
October 1942	November 1943	RAF Syerston	
November 1943	February 1946	RAF Metheringham	

== See also ==
- List of Royal Air Force aircraft squadrons
- List of UK Thor missile bases

== Bibliography ==
- Jefford, G. G. (2001). RAF Squadrons (2nd ed.). Airlife Publishing, UK. ISBN 1-84037-141-2.
