= Grava =

Grava may refer to:

== Persons ==
- Dario Grava (born 1948), French retired professional football defender
- Gianluca Grava, retired Italian association football defender
- Jean-Marc Grava (born 1971), French track and field athlete
- Lino Grava (1927-2010), Italian professional football player
- Roger Grava (1922–1949), Italian born French football striker
- Sigurd Grava (1934–2009), American scholar and architect

== Other uses ==
- Grava 4, a 2002 album by American duo Drexciya
- Grava school complex, Athens, Greece
- Cima Grava, also known as Grabspitze or Hochferner, the second highest peak in the Pfunderer Mountains
- Microsoft Codename "Grava", a set of tools for creating and using educational and training materials

== See also ==
- Gravina (disambiguation)
