= Gravin =

Gravin may refer to:

- Elina Gravin (born 2007), Swedish gymnast
- Gravin van Buren, defunct Dutch restaurant

== See also ==
- Gravina
- Graviner
- Gradin (surname)
