= Gravina =

Gravina may refer to:

== People with the surname ==
- Carla Gravina (born 1941), Italian actress and politician
- Cesare Gravina (1858–1954), Italian silent film actor
- Dominic Gravina (ca. 1573–1643), Italian Dominican theologian
- Dorothea Gravina (1905–1990), English mountain climber
- Federico Carlos Gravina y Nápoli (1756–1806), Italian-Spanish admiral
- Gabriele Gravina (born 1953), Italian sports director
- Giovanni Vincenzo Gravina (1664–1718), Italian jurist and man of letters
- John of Gravina (1294–1336), also John, Duke of Durazzo, Prince of Achaea
- Pasquale Gravina (born 1970), Italian volleyball player
- Rebecca Gravina, Australian structural engineer
- Vanessa Gravina (born 1974), Italian actress

== Places ==
=== Italy ===
- Gravina di Catania, a municipality of the Province of Catania, Sicily
- Gravina in Puglia, a town and municipality of the Province of Bari, Apulia
  - Gravina DOC, Italian wine region located around the town of Gravina
- Gravina (river), a river in southern Italy
- Roggiano Gravina, a municipality of the Province of Cosenza, Calabria

=== United States ===
- Gravina Island, Alexander Archipelago, Alaska
- Gravina Islands, Alexander Archipelago, Alaska

== Ships ==
- Gravina (clipper), a clipper ship built in Hoboken, New Jersey, in 1853
- Spanish ship Gravina, several Spanish Navy ships

== Other uses ==
- Duke of Gravina and the (arch)ducal family of Orsini-Gravina
- Roman Catholic Diocese of Gravina-Montepeloso, a former ecclesiastical territory of the Roman Catholic Church in southern Italy

== See also ==
- Graviner
- Gravin
