= RAF Syerston =

Royal Air Force training station in Nottinghamshire, England

RAF Syerston
- Syerston, Nottinghamshire in England
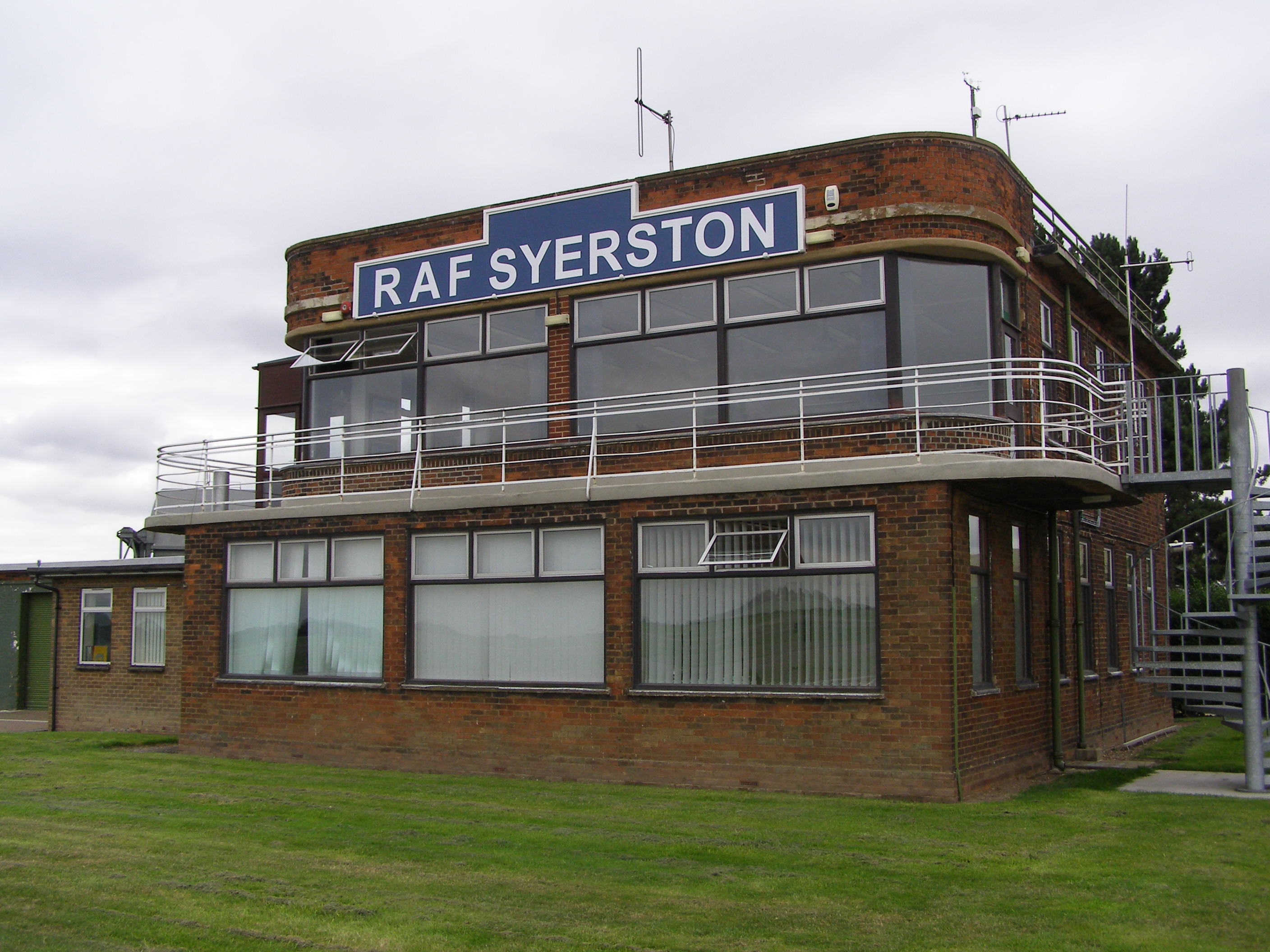
- The air traffic control tower in 2006

- Praesta in officiis (Latin for 'Excel in duties')

Site information
- Type: Royal Air Force flying training station
- Code: YN
- Owner: Ministry of Defence
- Operator: Royal Air Force
- Controlled by: No. 22 Group (Training) RAF (originally 1 then 5 Group)
- Condition: Active
- Website: www.raf.mod.uk/our-organisation/stations/raf-syerston/

Location
- Shown within Nottinghamshire
- Coordinates: 53°01′24″N 000°54′42″W

Site history
- Built: 1939/40
- Built by: John Laing & Son Ltd
- In use: 1940–1971; 1975–present

Garrison information
- Current commander: Group Captain Barry Dale
- Occupants: HQ No. 2 Flying Training School; Central Gliding School; No. 644 Volunteer Gliding Squadron

Airfield information
- Identifiers: ICAO: EGXY, WMO: 03372
- Elevation: 69 metres (226 feet) AMSL
Runways
Direction	Length and surface
06/24	1,827 metres (5,994 ft) asphalt
15/33	1,347 metres (4,419 ft) asphalt
11/29	1,292 metres (4,239 ft) asphalt
02/20	grass

Royal Air Force Syerston, commonly known simply as RAF Syerston (ICAO: EGXY), is a Royal Air Force station in the parish of Flintham, near Newark, Nottinghamshire, England. Opened in 1940, it was used by the Royal Air Force (RAF) as a bomber base during the Second World War, operating Vickers Wellingtons, Avro Manchesters, and the Avro Lancaster heavy bombers. Post-war, it became home to Jet Provosts of the 2 Flying Training School. It is now home to the Royal Air Force Central Gliding School.

== History ==
=== Bomber Command ===
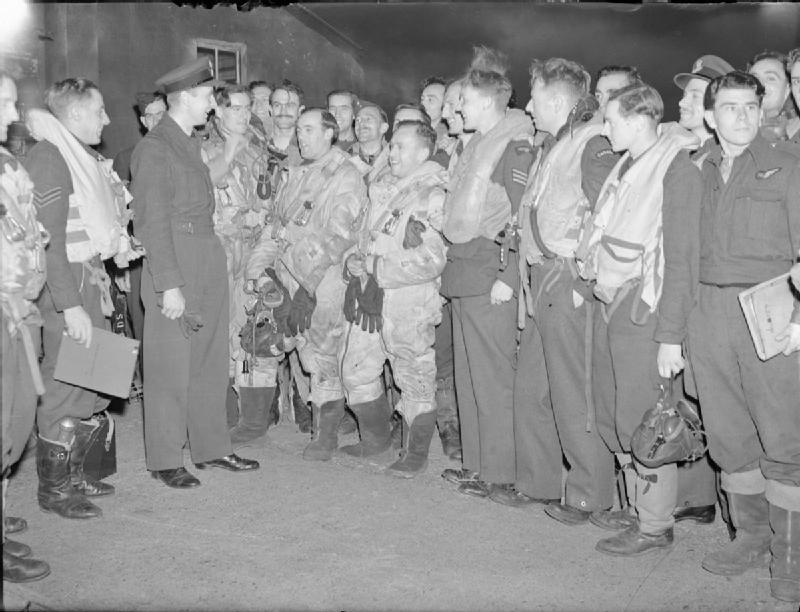
Wing Commander F R Jeffs, OC No. 207 Squadron RAF, wishes his aircrews good luck at RAF Syerston, before they board their aircraft for a night raid on Bremen, Germany. 207 Sqn were detached from their base at Bottesford, Leicestershire, to Syerston in August 1942, and moved from Bottesford/Syerston to Langar, Nottinghamshire, the following month.

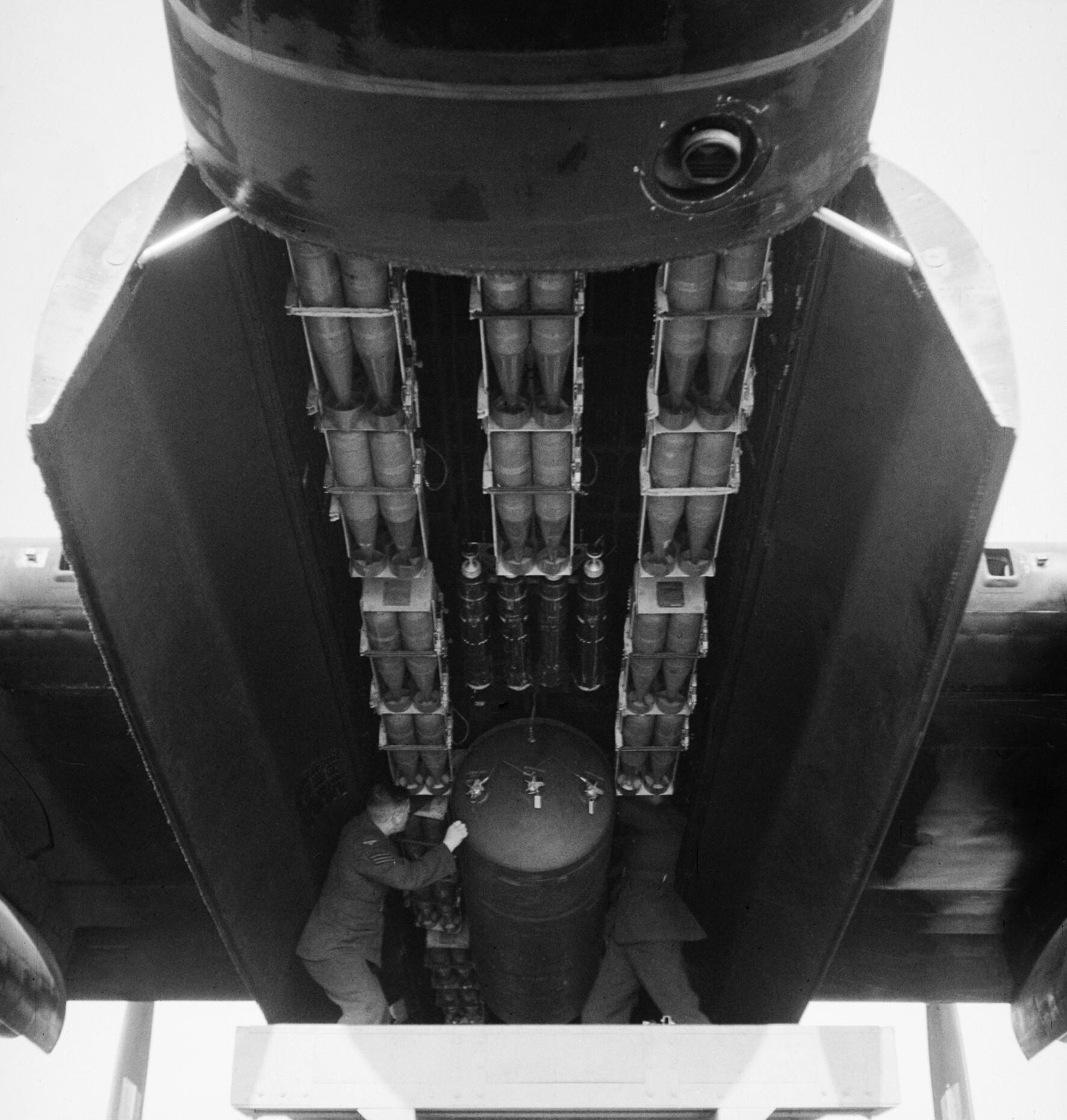
Armourers make final checks on the bomb load of an Avro Lancaster B Mk I of No. 207 Squadron RAF at Syerston, Nottinghamshire, before a night bombing operation to Bremen, Germany, 13 September 1942. The mixed load (Bomber Command executive codeword 'Usual'), consists of a 4,000 lb HC bomb ('cookie') and small bomb containers (SBCs) filled with 30 lb incendiaries, with the addition of four 250 lb target indicators (TI).

RAF Syerston was built as part of the bomber expansion in the late 1930s, but did not open until 1 December 1940. The first aircraft were Vickers Wellingtons crewed by Polish flyers who had joined the RAF. In July 1941, they were replaced by members of the Royal Canadian Air Force (RCAF), flying Handley-Page Hampdens. From December 1941 until 5 May 1942, the base was closed whilst a concrete runway was built with two T2 hangars. When it re-opened, it became part of No. 5 Group. In 1942, several squadrons of Avro Lancaster aircraft arrived. No. 61 Conversion Flight between May and August 1942 with Manchesters and Lancasters and No. 408 Conversion Flight between May and June 1942 used the airfield supporting their respective squadrons. The airfield was used as a Relief Landing Ground for No. 16 (Polish) SFTS during Winter 1942/43

In March 1943, Wing Commander Guy Gibson was commanding officer of 106 Sqn at Syerston, before he was given the task of forming 617 Sqn – The Dambusters, at RAF Coningsby.

On 3/4 November 1943, Bill Reid of 61 Squadron was awarded a Victoria Cross on a mission flown from Syerston.

On 17 November 1943, the operational squadrons departed, and the station was used for bomber crew training, led by Captain Robert White. No. 1668 Heavy Conversion Unit joined on 17 November 1943 and became No. 5 Lancaster Finishing School four days later. No. 1485 (Bombing) Gunnery Flight between November 1943 and February 1944. From November 1943 to July 1944, there was also No. 1690 (Bomber) Defence Training Flight in attendance with several Wellingtons, Spitfires, Hurricanes, plus a few Martinet tug aircraft; all employed in brushing up the skills of air gunners on air-to-air exercises. The LFS left on 1 April 1945, with No. 49 Squadron arriving from RAF Fulbeck later in the month who only had one operation before leaving to RAF Mepal in September. Bomber Command Film Flight Unit between April and October 1945 used the airfield.

=== Post-war use ===
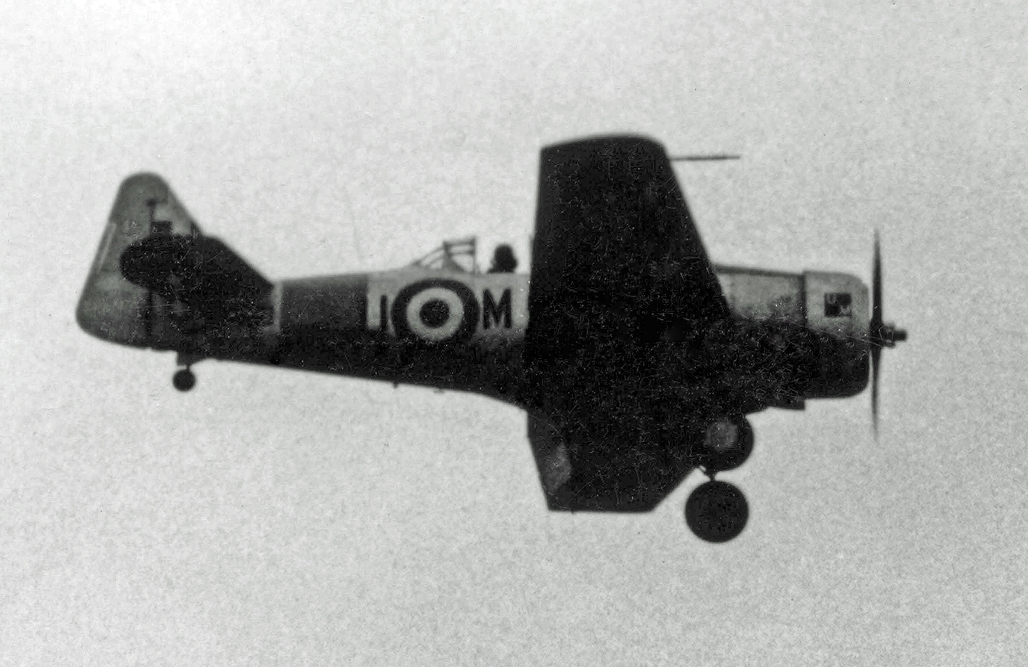
Harvard IIB trainer of No. 22 Flying Training School (22 FTS) landing at RAF Syerston in July 1954

On 25 October 1945, the station became part of Transport Command with No. 1668 Heavy Conversion Unit RAF arriving from RAF Leicester East, which stayed until 5 January 1948 when it moved to RAF Dishforth. No. 1331 Heavy Transport Conversion Unit reformed here on 15 December 1946 with the Halifax A.7, the unit was disbanded on 5 January 1948. No. 1333 (Transport Support) Conversion Unit arrived October 1945, absorbing No. 1385 Heavy Transport Conversion Unit during July 1946, became No. 1333 Transport Support Training Unit during July 1946 then moved to North Luffenham during January 1948.

Syerston was taken over by Flying Training Command on 1 February 1948, when No. 22 Service Flying Training School (22 SFTS) arrived from RAF Ouston, the unit was renamed to No. 22 FTS one day later, the unit trained pilots for the Fleet Air Arm (FAA). Other nearby RAF airfields used for flying circuits were RAF Newton (February 1948 - November 1951) and RAF Tollerton (November 1951 - May 1955). The training school became No. 1 Flying Training School (1 FTS) on 1 May 1955.

In late February 1965, the South Notts Hunt crossed the airfield, with jet aircraft taking off. Night flying stopped in September 1969. In June 1969 the station had 700 personnel, with 77 women in the WRAF.

The flying training school was disbanded on 16 January 1970 when the need for pilots had diminished, and the station lay vacant. Syerston was placed under care and maintenance from 1971 and used as a Relief Landing Ground for RAF College during 1972.

In 1975 part of the station was re-opened when the Air Cadets Central Gliding School moved from RAF Spitalgate to Syerston.

== Role and operations ==
643 VGS joined in October 1992, followed by No. 645 VGS from April 1998 until 2005. Most of the original station buildings were demolished in 1997 except for two hangars, the air traffic control tower, and one H-block.

In January 2014, the Central Gliding School (CGS) and No. 644 Volunteer Gliding Squadron have been based at Syerston.

2014 saw the reformation of No. 2 Flying Training School (2 FTS) at Syerston, along with a permanent home for Headquarters No. 2 Flying Training School (HQ 2 FTS), the Royal Air Force Central Gliding School (RAF CGS), and No. 644 Volunteer Gliding Squadron (644 VGS).

== List of Station Commanders ==
- 1948, Group Captain Edward Hugh Markham David CBE DFC (10 January 1901 - 10 August 1957), awarded the DFC in September 1941, awarded the CBE in the 1950 New Year Honours, he married Muriel Sanderson Robins (1901–90), of Boston, Lincolnshire on 29 June 1937, had children Jeremy, Diana, Carol and Hilary; he died aged 56 in August 1957 in Billingshurst.
- 1950, Group Captain George Francis Wheaton Heycock DFC (17 September 1909 - 27 June 1983), the son of Rev Francis Wheaton Heycock of Roehampton, becoming a test pilot in Hampshire
- March 1955, Group Captain H T Bennett
- 20 November 1957, Group Captain John Hubert Lempriere Blount DFC (24 November 1919 - 7 December 1967), Air Commodore Blount was killed aged 48 at 9.15am on Thursday 7 December 1967 in a red-coloured Westland Whirlwind, one of two, of the Queen's Flight, in a crash which killed four RAF officers, 35-year-old Queen's Flight engineering officer Squadron Leader Michael Hermon of Avon Road in Devizes, the pilot 49-year-old Squadron Leader Jack Liversedge DFC, and the navigator 36-year-old Flight Lieutenant Ronald Fisher. A rotor blade had sheared off, at a height of 500 feet.
- February 1960, Group Captain Gerald Bernard Warner CBE DFC, aged 42, awarded the CBE in the 1962 Birthday Honours; he was born in 1917, from St Helens, and attended Cowley Grammar School, and was a nephew of the headmaster Gerald Dowse; he married on 2 March 1940 at Rainhill Parish Church
- 1 August 1962, Group Captain James William Louw DFC, with a 19-year-old daughter, born 2 January 1943, who had joined the WRAF at RAF Jurby; he was born in Heidelberg, Gauteng in 1918, the son of Tobias Louw of Germiston, he had joined the RAF in 1938, when a Flight Lieutenant in 240 Squadron he was awarded the DFC and married Joan Barbara Grainger of Belfast on 25 July 1941 at Killadeas church, and flew Henri Giraud out of France in April 1942, and was the first person to fly the Consolidated PBY Catalina operationally
- 5 August 1967, Group Captain Rex David Roe (4 May 1925 – 3 November 2002), later Air Chief Marshal, he had previously been three years stationed at RAF Pitreavie Castle

== Based units ==
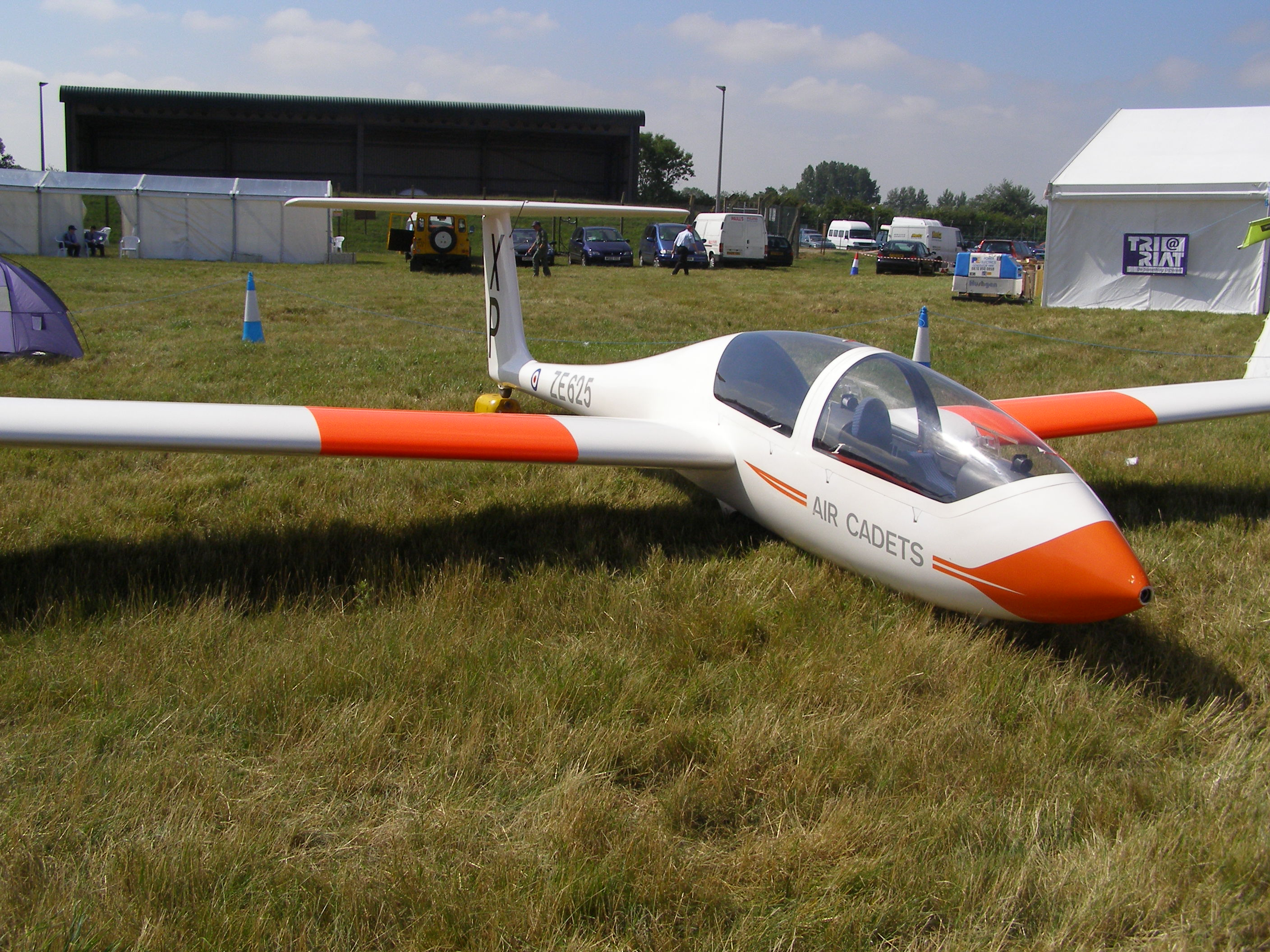
RAF Viking T Mk1 (ZE625), a type currently based at Syerston, used by the Royal Air Force Air Cadets.

Notable units based at RAF Syerston.

No. 22 Group (Training) RAF (22 Grp)

- No. 2 Flying Training School (2 FTS)
  - Headquarters No. 2 Flying Training School (HQ 1 FTS)
  - Central Gliding School (CGS) – Grob Viking T1
  - No. 644 Volunteer Gliding Squadron (644 VGS) – Grob Viking T1

=== Parented units ===
Royal Air Force Syerston is parent to four satellite airfields, namely RAF Kenley, RAF Kirknewton, RAF Topcliffe, and RAF Little Rissington.

== Historical units ==
- No. 49 Squadron RAF (22 April 1945 – 28 September 1945) — Avro Lancaster I & III
- No. 61 Squadron RAF (5 May 1942 – 17 November 1943) — Avro Lancaster I, II & III
- No. 106 Squadron RAF (1 October 1942 – 17 November 1943) — Avro Lancaster I & III
- No. 304 (Polish) Squadron RAF (December 1940 – 20 July 1941) — Vickers Wellington IC
- No. 305 (Polish) Squadron RAF (December 1940 – 20 July 1941) — Vickers Wellington IC
- No. 408 Squadron RCAF (July 1941 – 8 December 1941) — Handley Page Hampden
- No. 504 (County of Nottingham) Squadron RAuxAF (May 1946 – April 1947) — de Havilland Mosquito
- Four Counties Gliding Club
- Loughborough Students Union Gliding Club
- Nottingham Air Touring Group
- RAF Syerston Flying Club
- No. 27 Heavy Glider Maintenance Section
- No. 2727 Squadron RAF Regiment

== Incidents ==
'At Home' part programme cover

On 20 September 1958, the prototype Avro Vulcan VX770 crashed during a fly past at RAF Syerston Battle of Britain At Home display. A Rolls-Royce test pilot was authorised to fly VX770 on an engine performance sortie with a fly past at the Battle of Britain display. The briefing was for the pilot to fly over the airfield twice at 200–300 feet (60–90 metres), flying at a speed of 250–300 knots (460–560 kilometres per hour; 290–350 miles per hour). The Vulcan flew along the main 07/25 runway (now 06/24 due to magnetic shift), then started a roll to starboard and climbed slightly. Very shortly after, a kink appeared in the starboard mainplane leading edge, followed by a stripping of the leading edge of the wing. The starboard wingtip then broke, followed by a collapse of the main spar and wing structure. Subsequently, the Vulcan went into a dive, and began rolling with the starboard wing on fire, and struck the ground at the taxiway end of runway 07. Three occupants of a controllers' caravan were killed by debris, a fourth being injured. All the crew of the Vulcan were killed. Proposed causes of the accident have included pilot error, fatigue failure, and inadequate maintenance.

== See also ==
- List of Royal Air Force stations
- Air Training Corps

== Sources ==
- Falconer, J. (2012). RAF Airfields of World War 2. UK: Ian Allan Publishing. ISBN 978-1-85780-349-5.
- Jefford, C. G. (1988). RAF Squadrons. A comprehensive record of the movement and equipment of all RAF squadrons and their antecedents since 1912. Shrewsbury: Airlife. ISBN 1-85310-053-6.
- Sturtivant, R.; Hamlin, J. (2007). Royal Air Force flying training and support units since 1912. UK: Air-Britain (Historians). ISBN 978-0851-3036-59.
