= Operation Bellicose =

1943 British strategic bombing in WWII

- Part of Combined Bomber Offensive
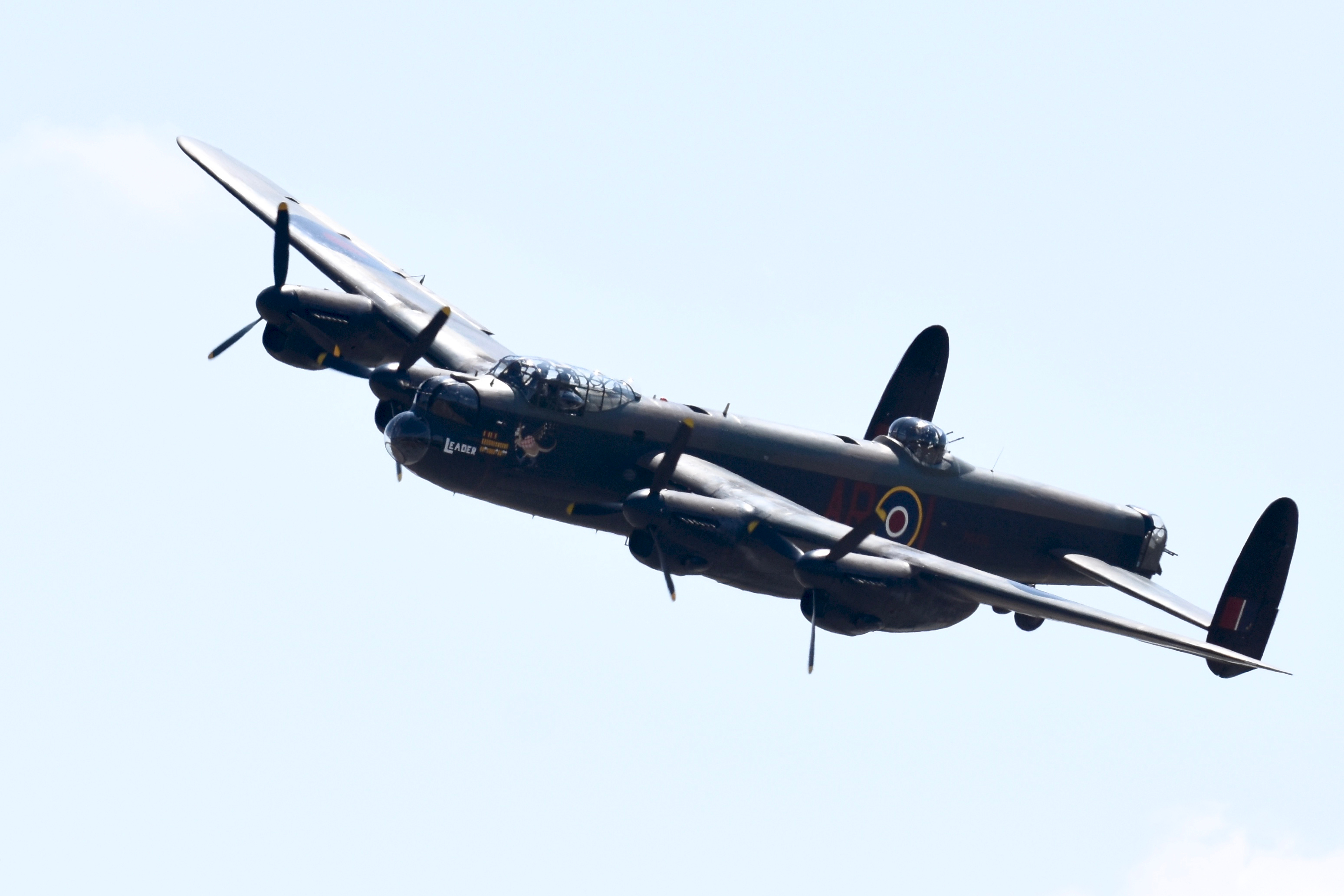
- Avro Lancaster
Date	20–24 June 1943
Location	Friedrichshafen, Germany; La Spezia, Italy
Result	Allied success

Belligerents
United Kingdom	Germany; Italy

Commanders and leaders
Ralph Cochrane; Don Bennett	Unknown

Units involved
RAF Bomber Command; No. 5 Group RAF; No. 8 Group RAF	Luftwaffe; Regia Aeronautica

Strength
60 Avro Lancasters	Unknown

Operation Bellicose was an attack by Avro Lancaster bombers of the Royal Air Force on a German radar factory housed in the former Zeppelin Works at Friedrichshafen and the Italian naval base at La Spezia. It was the first shuttle bombing raid in the Second World War and the second use of a Master Bomber. In early June 1943, Central Interpretation Unit photo interpreter, Claude Wavell, identified a stack of ribbed baskets at the Zeppelin Works as Würzburg radar reflectors. After Winston Churchill viewed the photos at RAF Medmenham on 14 June, No. 5 Group RAF received the surprise orders on 16 June to attack Friedrichshafen during the next full moon.

On approach to the target, Wing Commander Gomm (467 Squadron RAAF) assumed control of the operation when the aircraft of Group Captain Slee, the master bomber, developed trouble. The main force was ordered to bomb from 4,600 metres (15,000 ft) rather than the planned 3,000 metres (10,000 ft) due to heavy flak. In the first phase, the Pathfinder Force (PFF) and Wing Commander Gomm dropped Target Indicator (TI) bombs for the main force to aim at. In the second phase, as dust and smoke obscured the TIs, Gomm ordered the main force to use 'time-and-distance' bombing runs from a location on the Lake Constance shore, along a measured distance to the target.

The bombers damaged the radar factory and destroyed the unsuspected V-2 rocket production line also housed in the Zeppelin Works, so that Bellicose accidentally became the first Allied air blow against the German V-weapons programme. No Lancasters were lost and from Friedrichshafen, the aircraft continued to the United States Army Air Forces (USAAF) base at Maison Blanche, Algeria. On 23–24 June, eight of the original force of sixty Lancasters remained in Algeria for repairs and the remaining 52 bombed the Italian naval base at La Spezia, damaging an oil depot and an armaments store, then flew to Britain, again without loss.

== Background ==
The Zeppelin shed, 300 m × 50 m (980 ft × 160 ft) and 60 m (200 ft) high, had been built at Friedrichshafen-Löwenthal airfield in 1930–1931 and used by the Zeppelin company's last and largest airships, the LZ 127 Graf Zeppelin, LZ 129 Hindenburg and LZ 130 Graf Zeppelin II. After the Hindenburg was destroyed by fire in New Jersey in 1937 and the two Graf ships were broken up for scrap at Frankfurt in 1940, the vast hangar fell into disuse. In early 1943 it was dismantled and transported in sections on a specially laid track 3 km (1.9 mi) to the industrial suburbs of Friedrichshafen, where it was reconstructed.

British aerial reconnaissance of southern Germany was mainly carried out by de Havilland Mosquito PR IV and PR VIII aircraft of 540 Squadron from RAF Benson, Oxfordshire. The photographs were sent for assessment to the Central Interpretation Unit at Danesfield House near Medmenham, Buckinghamshire, 24 km (15 mi) from Benson. At the beginning of June 1943, Squadron Leader Claude Wavell, head of G Section (Radar & Radio) at Medmenham, noticed stacks of ribbed metalwork lying outside the Zeppelin shed in recent 'covers' of Friedrichshafen. The pattern of the stacks had changed between photographic sorties, implying activity, and Wavell identified the metalwork as parts for the distinctive 7.3-metre (24 ft) lattice reflector dishes of Giant Würzburg radar (Würzburg-Riese) sets.

The appearance and size of Würzburg-Riese dishes had been known to British intelligence since 2 May 1942, when Flight Lieutenant A. E. 'Tony' Hill, in a Spitfire PR IV of 1 Photographic Reconnaissance Unit from Benson, had taken low-level oblique pictures of a German radar station at Domburg on Walcheren Island, Netherlands. The pictures showed two Würzburg-Riese, pointed in different directions, so that the analysts got both a profile and a more full-face view. In the profile shot, a startled Luftwaffe member was standing at the foot of the ladder to the control cabin behind the dish, giving scale to the picture. A previous oblique by Hill, taken on 15 December 1941, had shown an example of the original, much smaller Würzburg set, with a 3-metre (9.8 ft) sheet-metal dish, on a Normandy clifftop. This led to Operation Biting, the Bruneval Raid of 27–28 February 1942, in which C Company of 2nd Battalion, Parachute Regiment under Major (later Major-General) John Frost, parachuted from Armstrong Whitworth Whitley bombers of 51 Squadron (Wing Commander Charles Pickard), stole the Würzburg and brought it to England aboard Motor Gun Boat (MGB) 312 of the Royal Navy.

In radar matters, Medmenham reported to Dr Reginald Victor Jones, Assistant Director of Intelligence (Science) at the Air Ministry. Jones's department, drawing on information from air reconnaissance, PoW interrogations, resistance agents in France and Belgium, Enigma cipher decrypts, and the monitoring of Luftwaffe radio traffic and radar signals by RAF ground stations and specially equipped bombers known as Ferrets, had built up a detailed knowledge of the German air-defence system. The Würzburg-Riese was similar in signal to the original Bruneval Würzburg, operating at 560 MHz, but it was more precise and longer-ranging due to its more powerful transmitter and its much larger reflector dish. By 1943, while the original Würzburg was still in service with flak and searchlight batteries, the Luftwaffe used the Würzburg-Riese for ground-controlled interception, vectoring German night fighters onto British bombers. The Würzburg-Riesen were installed in pairs, as seen in Hill's Walcheren pictures, because one set tracked the bomber while the other tracked the fighter, until the fighter's airborne radar acquired the target.

Jones mentioned the Friedrichshafen findings to Prime Minister Winston Churchill's chief scientific adviser, Lord Cherwell (Professor Frederick Lindemann), in whose Oxford laboratory Jones had once worked as a researcher. According to Wavell, Churchill visited Medmenham, viewed the Friedrichshafen covers, and asked, "Have we been there yet?" Wavell said no; the RAF had not bombed Friedrichshafen. Cherwell had spoken to the Chief of Air Staff, Air Chief Marshal Sir Charles Portal and with the Prime Minister's interest engaged, Operation Bellicose was ordered.

Arthur Harris, as Air Officer Commanding-in-Chief RAF Bomber Command, was in the midst of the Battle of the Ruhr, a campaign against the industrial conurbations of north-west Germany carried out from March to July 1943. These attacks, on targets only ninety minutes' flying time from Bomber Command bases, made use of the short spring and summer nights and also exploited the Oboe radar-ranging device, which enabled high-flying Mosquito bombers of No. 8 Group (Pathfinder Force) to place their pyrotechnic TI bombs accurately. Reliant on signals from ground stations, Oboe was restricted by the curvature of the Earth to a range of 450 km (280 mi). Beyond Oboe range, the Pathfinders normally used a combination of visual methods and airborne ground-mapping H2S radar, with much less consistent results.

Harris opposed 'precision' bombing as a general policy, in part because he felt it made bomber operations too predictable, saying,

I do not believe in 'panacea' targets, e.g. oil, rubber, ball bearings. Specialising on one such means that the enemy concentrates all his defences [...].

Harris knew that his area bombing campaign against the Ruhr was incurring the same problem, and said,

if I concentrated exclusively on north-west Germany for too long a time the enemy would shift his defences to that area, thereby economising in men and material and at the same time increasing our losses... I had to take the earliest opportunity to carry out operations at greater range [...].

Since 10 June 1943, Harris had been under an Air Staff order known as the Pointblank Directive, which required him to give priority to targets associated with the German fighter force. This directive arose from the Combined Chiefs of Staff Conference in Washington, DC, in May. As Harris later wrote,

the 8th United States Army Air Force was to attack the principal airframe and other aircraft factories while my Command was to attack the industrial towns in which there was the largest number of aircraft component factories; most of these towns, as it happened, were further east or south than the Ruhr.

As a radar factory, the Zeppelin shed at Friedrichshafen was a valid and important Pointblank target, but an added attraction, in Harris's view, was its great distance from England,

a further reason for carrying out this rather elaborate operation was that it would help to spread the enemy's defences; Friedrichshafen had every reason to consider itself safe from attack, especially in the summer months, and this unexpectedly deep penetration might well cause other places outside the more vulnerable areas to scream for defences [...].

== Prelude ==
=== Plan ===
The obvious difficulty was that, with the target lying some 1,050 kilometres (650 mi) from Bomber Command bases as the crow flies, or 1,300 kilometres (800 mi) by the best indirect tactical route, it was impossible for 320 km/h (200 mph) bombers to fly there and back in darkness at midsummer. The coast of North Africa was within range of Lancaster bombers and the USAAF agreed to receive the bombers at Blida and Maison Blanche, two American bases in Algeria. Although the Americans were not equipped to service Lancasters properly, they would at least be able to refuel and re-arm them. Harris's orders at this time required him to attack Italian targets when possible, as part of the government's policy to knock Italy out of the war, so he decided that the Friedrichshafen force would bomb the Italian naval base of La Spezia at dusk on the return flight to England.

Harris assigned the operation to 5 Group (Air Vice-Marshal Ralph Cochrane). Harris had commanded 5 Group earlier in the war. Under his successor, Air Vice-Marshal John Slessor, it became the first bomber group to begin re-equipping with Lancasters and under Air Vice-Marshal Alec Coryton it had gained a reputation for daring low-level attacks. First came the Augsburg raid of 17 April 1942, when six Lancasters of 44 Squadron and another six of 97 Squadron (the only two operational Lancaster squadrons) were dispatched in daylight to bomb the MAN factory producing diesel engines for U-boats, with the loss of seven from the twelve aircraft. Next was Operation Robinson, the Le Creusot raid of 17 October 1942, when 94 Lancasters, led by Wing Commander Leonard Slee of 49 Squadron, made a dusk attack on the Schneider-Creusot munitions complex in Burgundy, flying at tree top height from the Bay of Biscay and returning to England in darkness, for the loss of only one aircraft. Reconnaissance pilot Tony Hill, whose pictures had done so much for British understanding of enemy radar, was shot down while attempting to take post-strike photographs of Le Creusot on 21 October. The Germans recovered him alive from the wreckage of the Spitfire and R. V. Jones, hearing this from the French Resistance, began to organise a rescue operation by special agents but Hill died of his injuries before it could be put into effect.

Cochrane, who took over 5 Group from Coryton in February 1943, soon oversaw Operation Chastise, the Dams Raid of 16/17 May, for which Harris ordered the creation of the special 617 Squadron. The successful part of this operation – the attacks on the Möhne and Eder dams – had been controlled over Very high frequency (VHF) Radiotelephone (R/T) by Wing Commander Guy Gibson. Cochrane decided to use the same method at Friedrichshafen and appointed Leonard Slee, to lead the raid, with Wing Commander Cosme Gomm of 467 Squadron RAAF as his deputy. Although Gomm led a nominally Australian unit, he came from Brazil, his parents lived in São Paulo and only two of his crew were Australian.

=== Time-and-distance bombing ===
Harris decided that Bellicose should not be left to 5 Group alone and that the target should be marked by a small force of Pathfinder Lancasters from 8 Group (Air Vice-Marshal Don Bennett). This led to friction between Cochrane and Bennett, the historian, Anthony Verrier, who interviewed both men in the 1960s, wrote that,

the two Group commanders had a row – civil, but a row nonetheless – over the execution of the Friedrichshafen attack.

Cochrane wanted to use a new technique he was interested in, known as time-and-distance bombing. This required the crews to identify three landmarks lying in a straight line on the run-up to the target. Between the first two landmarks, the aircraft made a timed run to establish the true ground speed and wind drift. The navigator then calculated the time and heading from the third landmark to the bomb release point. Bombs were dropped blind. In principle, no marking was required. This addressed concerns over the accuracy of Pathfinder marking beyond Oboe range and also the problem that, even if the markers were on target, the dust and smoke of main-force bombing might obscure them. On the approach to Friedrichshafen the landmarks would be features of Lake Constance's shore, which should be sufficiently distinct on a moonlit night.

Since Harris was not allowing 5 Group a free hand, Cochrane and Bennett compromised. Picked Pathfinder crews would mark the target and would re-mark it throughout the attack. Cochrane's main-force crews would bomb on the markers unless or until the raid controller decided that the markers were off-target or obscured, in which case time-and-distance bombing would be used. The operation was now 'on call' for the next moon period, a matter of days away. On the morning of Wednesday 16 June, four Pathfinder crews of 97 (Straits Settlements) Squadron at RAF Bourn, Cambridgeshire, were detailed to,

take a week's kit, and fly up to Scampton directly after lunch. [... When one pilot asked why, his flight commander said, ...] I don't know. You'll get all the gen when you get there [...].

This squadron, considered by Guy Gibson to be the best in Bomber Command, had taken part in both the Augsburg and the Le Creusot raids and had transferred to the Pathfinders from 5 Group only in April. Slee had flown several trips with the squadron in summer 1942. The four pilots whose crews were selected for Bellicose were Squadron Leader E. E. 'Rod' Rodley DFC, Flight Lieutenant J. H. J. 'Johnnie' Sauvage DFC, Pilot Officer D. I. 'Jonah' Jones and Pilot Officer J. F. 'Jimmy' Munro RCAF. Rodley was on his second tour with the squadron and had flown on the Augsburg raid. Sauvage, a French volunteer from the Seychelles, was also highly experienced, having flown a previous tour on Handley Page Hampdens with 44 Squadron. Jones and Munro were on their first tour, but Munro had completed 28 operations and he and Jones had recently been recommended for the Distinguished Flying Cross in recognition of their skill and tenacity.

At the 5 Group airfield at RAF Scampton, Lincolnshire, Slee gave the Pathfinders a preliminary briefing. He did not tell them the nature of the target, only that it was of special importance, that it was housed in the Zeppelin shed at Friedrichshafen and that it measured just 320 by 140 m (350 by 150 yd). (This would include the outside areas where Claude Wavell had identified the stacks of parts.) The Pathfinders would be marking for a force of 56 Lancaster crews selected from 5 Group squadrons and the job required accuracy of "the highest order". The marking tactics would be left to the Pathfinder captains. Rodley recalled,

We decided that the best way we could tackle this target would be to find a landmark on Lake Constance which we could pick up in night conditions, and make a timed run across the lake to find the Zeppelin sheds.

It was decided that Jones and Munro should aim to arrive one minute ahead of the others and at a higher altitude. As they made landfall at Friedrichshafen they would begin dropping flares. Rodley and Sauvage, following on, would pick out the Zeppelin shed by the light of the flares and mark it with Target Indicator bombs. Rodley recalled that the TIs were to be,

alternate reds and greens, and when we got one on the roof of the sheds, we would broadcast to the Main Force to bomb the red or the green, as the case might be.

Low flying would be needed to avoid detection en route to the target, so the Pathfinder crews flew low-level cross-country exercises that night and the next, visiting the giant airship sheds at RAF Cardington, Bedfordshire. On the night of 18 June, a dress rehearsal was held, with the Pathfinders illuminating and marking a target on the bombing range at RAF Wainfleet, on the Lincolnshire coast, for the 5 Group force. The crews were confined to camp when not flying and were forbidden to use the telephone.

Slee held the full briefing for the 25 Pathfinder and 5 Group crews based at Scampton on the morning of 19 June. The crews learned most of the plan, including the surprise onward flight to North Africa and the assignment of a second target for the return flight. Some crews managed to draw tropical kits from the stores: pith helmets, desert boots, and khaki shirts and shorts. The weather was later predicted to be unsuitable at Friedrichshafen that night, so the operation was postponed for 24 hours. The Schneider works at Le Creusot were attacked by 290 Halifaxes, Stirlings and Lancasters of 3, 4, 6 and 8 Groups. Instead of TIs, the Pathfinders dropped large numbers of flares. The main force was supposed to identify the target visually but crews found it hard to see through the dazzle and smoke of so many flares. A fifth of the bomb loads did hit the Schneider works and residential areas were severely damaged.

=== Lake Constance ===
At its north-west end, Lake Constance is divided by a 16-kilometre (10 mi) spit of land with the German city of Konstanz at the tip, providing a good pinpoint. From Konstanz, Friedrichshafen lies 24 kilometres (15 mi) due east across the water; it is set in a bay, and the bombers' track would take them directly over the near headland of the bay after 13 km (8 mi). At 20.1 kilometres (12.5 mi), less than a minute from the target, the bombers would cross the eastern shore at a shallow angle. The same three reference points would serve for time-and-distance bombing by the main force.

== Attack ==
=== Outbound ===
On Sunday 20 June, Bomber Command ordered Bellicose to go ahead. Take-off was made in the usual radio silence from 9:45 p.m. The Pathfinder Lancasters were loaded to 910 kg (2,000 lb) over the current all-up limit of 29,000 kg (63,000 lb), with a full fuel load of 9,790 L (2,587 US gal) as well as oil, crew, machine-gun ammunition, flares, TIs and high explosives. In case anyone was shot down, every Pathfinder carried six 110 kg (250 lb) TIs, three red, three green, sixteen flares and eight 230 kg (500 lb) bombs. The overload factor was a particular concern because Scampton still had uneven grass runways. The bombers all cleared the hedge and lifted through the evening mist without trouble. The crews could see Lancasters climbing out of 5 Group's other bases to join the loose formation. The force headed west of London and turned south over Reading, Berkshire, for the headland of Selsey Bill on the Sussex coast, climbing all the time, as high as they could go, to make allowance for the flak defences of occupied Normandy. At Selsey Bill they circled to let the light fade before crossing the English Channel.

They set course into a belt of thunderstorms but only one aircraft encountered serious trouble, that of the Master Bomber. Slee was station commander at RAF Dunholme Lodge and technically not an operational pilot, so he was riding as 'second dickey' in the flight engineer's seat aboard a 49 Squadron Lancaster. The skipper was Gerry Fawke, who would later become a flight commander with 617 Squadron. Crossing the enemy coast blind, in dense thunderclouds at 5,800 m (19,000 ft), Fawke had just begun losing height to get under the storm when the Lancaster was engaged by radar-predicted flak. The navigator, whose radio aids were out of action due to the storm's interference, said he was not sure where they were. It might be Caen, or else the strongly defended E-boat base at Le Havre. On board, to observe the Friedrichshafen flak defences, was the 5 Group army flak liaison officer, Major Mullock. He estimated that four four-gun batteries of heavy 88s were firing on this one aircraft. Gerry Fawke took evasive action, corkscrewing on instruments and got through. Jimmy Munro of 97 Squadron, passing dead on track over the entry point, the seaside resort of Cabourg, between Caen and Le Havre, attracted some light flak but it was out of range.

The force turned south-east, descending to 3,000 m (10,000 ft) by the time they reached Orléans. The worst of the weather behind them, they swung east for the long straight run to Germany, descending to 910 metres (3,000 ft) or below. Although the German radar belt extended through eastern France to the Swiss frontier, extreme low flying was not considered necessary or advisable. Upland terrain restricted German radar coverage and the heavily laden, slow-climbing bombers needed enough height to cross the southern edge of the Vosges mountain range just before the Rhine.

Not far short of the Vosges, at 45 minutes from target, Fawke's port inner engine, began emitting sparks, possibly due to flak-damage. Fawke shut it down and feathered the prop. In Doug Jones's Pathfinder aircraft, the bomb aimer, Flying Officer Tom Hodkinson, lying in the nose, called out the Rhine and as the force crossed the river into Germany, north of Basel, Jones began climbing to attack height. The route curved around the northern border of neutral Switzerland towards Friedrichshafen. Fawke unfeathered No. 2 propeller to turn the engine, because the port inner powered the Lancaster's Mark XIV bomb sight computer but the engine caught fire. Fawke jettisoned the bombs and dived to starboard, into Swiss airspace, so that the crew could bail out if need be, but the Graviner fire extinguisher system extinguished the fire and Fawke resumed course to target. Slee broke radio silence to tell Gomm to take command.

Jimmy Munro saw the Swiss illuminate several searchlights and fire a few warning flak shells, probably because of the master bomber's incursion. Munro kept going, pinpointed on the cape of Konstanz and circled to lose time. At H-Hour minus four minutes, he set off across the lake to Friedrichshafen.

=== Bombing ===
German flak and searchlight crews were disciplined and would not break the blackout for aircraft that might simply pass by. As Munro's Lancaster made landfall on the eastern shore at 3,700 m (12,000 ft), the bomb aimer, Sergeant Eric Suswain began releasing the first batch of eight large flares. Moments later, over to port, another string of flares appeared from Doug Jones's aircraft. Without sight of each other since the Channel, both Illuminator crews had arrived on time and on target, almost in formation. Rod Rodley, a minute behind and slightly below, aimed his aircraft so that it would run between the two flare lanes. The buildings of Friedrichshafen appeared in the glow and Rodley's bomb aimer, Sergeant Rae, picked out the Zeppelin shed.

From reconnaissance photographs and pilots' reports, Major Mullock had estimated that Friedrichshafen was defended by 16 to 20 heavy and 18 to 20 light flak guns and 25 searchlights, in a 10–13 km (6–8 mi) radius of the target. Harris considered these defences "comparatively light". As the flares were laid, signalling imminent attack, the guns and searchlights sprang to life. Predicted flak burst so close to Munro's aircraft that the crew heard the shell fragments patter on the alloy skin. As the timer released Munro's last flare, one searchlight, then perhaps a dozen more, locked on to the Lancaster. Munro made a series of diving turns to escape and levelled off in the dark at 610 m (2,000 ft) indicated. That was about 210 m (700 ft) above the local terrain.

The approaching main force bombers were at 1,500 to 3,000 m (5,000 to 10,000 ft). Slee decided this was too low, given the strength of the enemy reaction, and told Gomm to order the whole force to climb 1,500 metres (5,000 ft) higher. A loaded Lancaster at normal climb power, 2,650 rpm and 48-kilopascal (+7 psi) boost, would take 48 kilometres (30 mi) to do this and the nearest crews, already turning for the bomb run over the lake, would need to use maximum climb power, 2,850 rpm and 62 kilopascals (+9 psi).

Rodley and Sauvage ignored the order, they were already over Friedrichshafen, Rodley at 3,200 metres (10,500 ft), and Sauvage at 2,700 metres (9,000 ft). Rodley was busy with his bomb run, so intent on Rae's instructions that he hardly noticed the flak bursting all around him, except to correct for the buffets. As Rae let go the green TI, still well short of target to allow for the bomb's forward travel, the candles of a red marker, which could only have come from Sauvage's aircraft, cascaded onto the Zeppelin shed's roof and tumbled over the side. Rodley recalled, "I thought at the time that you couldn't do better than that". Gomm thought the red was 2.4 kilometres (1.5 mi) east of target. How either he, or the Pathfinders, could have mistaken the vast Zeppelin shed for any other structure in the area is not known. Moments later, Rodley's green TI burst over the town (the 97 Squadron record-book clerk would mistakenly record it as a red) and Gomm thought it was 370 metres (1,200 ft) east of target, more than 1.6 kilometres (1 mi) from Sauvage's red, even though Rodley thought he was aiming at the same thing as Sauvage. Gomm's aircraft now dropped flares and a green TI which Gomm claimed was on target; he said the Pathfinders asked for permission to back it, which was given. He reported that he ordered the main force to "attack visually", implying that they had to identify the target themselves as at Le Creusot, despite the fact that he claimed the flare illumination was inadequate and the moonlight was dimmed by a thin sheet of cloud high up, but he may have meant that he ordered the crews to bomb his green. To add to the confusion, Gomm's watch seems to have been set an hour ahead of everyone else's, or else he forgot the time when debriefing. Gomm said the time was about 2:40 a.m. but Slee's crew and the Swiss people watching from across the lake made it 1:40 a.m. Double British Summer Time and West European Summer Time being the same.

The main force began bombing, the Pathfinders circling back over the lake to re-illuminate and re-mark the target. Munro had to fly a long circuit to regain lost height and made only one more run, this time releasing his eight high-explosive 230 kilograms (500 lb) bombs as well as flares. Suswain aimed the bombs at a green TI dropped by Rodley, Sauvage or Gomm and saw them hit the target. The searchlights found the bomber again and Munro evaded with a diving turn. Jones made four more runs. On one, watched by the Swiss across the water, he was coned by searchlights and made a shallow dive at near maximum speed of 580 kilometres per hour (360 mph) indicated, faster than the searchlight crews could follow. Now down below the marker aircraft, he had to abandon another run because at that height the shock waves from the main force's bombs, particularly the 1,800-kilogram (4,000 lb) 'cookies', made it impossible to keep the Lancaster steady. Sauvage's aircraft was hit by flak on its fourth run and received hydraulic damage, one of the undercarriage legs dropping partway.

The orbiting Pathfinders attracted most of the defenders' attention, and the main force was almost unscathed, except for a 619 Squadron crew whose bomb aimer was killed by a flak fragment. Although the Pathfinders continued to re-mark, Gomm called for the remaining main-force crews to use time-and-distance bombing as the dust hid the markers. Rodley also considered that the bombing had become 'wild' by this time. Gomm thought the time-and-distance order was given at 2:47 a.m.; everyone else thought it was an hour earlier. Watchers on the Swiss side of Lake Constance, who saw the upward spray of searchlights and flak shells, the falling flares and TIs, the flash of bomb impacts and the bright fires taking hold, reported a "concentrated attack on the selected target," up to about 2:00 a.m. Houses at the south end of the lake 16 kilometres (10 mi) away were shaken by the explosions.

The last bombs fell at 1:58 a.m. and Slee, 13 minutes after arriving, announced that the attack was complete and all crews should leave the target area. By now only the master bombers and the Pathfinders were left. They turned south-east after the main force to cross the Central Eastern Alps of Austria, the snowy mountains looking blue in the moonlight. To clear the peaks it was necessary to climb to 4,300 metres (14,000 ft) in 97 kilometres (60 mi). Gerry Fawke had to do this on three engines with a heavy fuel load still aboard, which was not in the manual. Once past the edge of Swiss territory, the bombers tracked south-west for the Italian Lakes. German night fighter airfields and ground radar stations, were mainly concentrated in north-east France, the Low Countries, north-west Germany and Denmark. When the RAF raiders were reported at Friedrichshafen, 480–640 kilometres (300–400 mi) away, the Luftwaffe controller decided to marshal his fighters over the bases of Florennes, near Charleroi, and Juvincourt, near Reims, to catch the bomber force on its return.

=== Mediterranean crossing ===
Over the Apennine Mountains, then the Italian Riviera and the Mediterranean, the Lancaster force kept loose formation for protection as the sun came up. Italian fighters were a possible threat, and the Luftwaffe's Nachtjagdgeschwader 2 (Night Fighter Wing 2) was based in Italy, but the bombers had descended to low altitude again and seemed to be undetected. Off the Italian coast, Johnnie Sauvage and his crew saw Rod Rodley's Lancaster, just ahead of them, engulfed in a sudden red fireball. Rodley's flight engineer, Flight Sergeant Duffy, checked an inspection port and said the fire was in the bomb bay. Rodley realised that the vermilion glow was that of a red TI. The bomber was carrying a TI that the bomb aimer had fused from his switching panel but had not dropped, and, as the Lancaster descended, the barometric fuse had blown the bomb's tail off and ejected the pyrotechnic candles into the bomb bay. Rodley opened the bomb doors and Sauvage's crew saw the fireball fall away into the sea. But the explosion had damaged the hydraulic lines: Rodley could not close the bomb doors properly and the flaps were drooping.

=== Maison Blanche ===
There was fog over the North African coast and the American controllers at Blida airfield refused to let the bombers land. The entire force found itself circling over Maison Blanche, where the visibility was better. They had now been airborne for ten hours and, despite flying slowly at minimum power settings since Italy, they were on the last of their fuel, most of the flight had been at low level in warm air, which increased the Rolls-Royce Merlin engines' fuel consumption. It was difficult to see how, under normal procedures, they could all be landed in time. The US flying control officer drove in a radio-equipped Willys MB jeep to the end of the runway, began firing flares from a Very pistol so that everyone could see where to land. Pilot Officer Arthur Spencer, Jimmy Munro's navigator, remembered the American adding, "First man to make home base wins!" Rod Rodley recalled,

At one time, I saw one aircraft turning off at the end of the runway, one aircraft about three-quarters of the way down the runway, and one turning in on finals. I think we got about fifty aircraft down in ten minutes!

Munro landed safely at 7:45 a.m., just after Doug Jones. Slee, in Gerry Fawke's aircraft, landed at 7:52 a.m., Rod Rodley following at 7:55 a.m. Johnnie Sauvage, having reported his damaged undercarriage, was told to wait till last in case he blocked the runway. At 8:04 a.m., he touched down on his one good wheel, but, as the bomber's weight settled, the other undercarriage leg collapsed and the Lancaster slewed off the runway at speed and spun around, raising clouds of desert dust, till it came to rest. The crew got out unhurt but the bomber was a write-off. The crews spent the next couple of days at Maison Blanche. The Americans advised men without tropical kits not to go off base, despite the lure of shops selling fruit and wine not available in wartime Britain. Sauvage's wireless operator, Flight Sergeant Eddie Wheeler, ignored this instruction and was briefly detained by Algerian police who thought his blue RAF uniform looked German. Sauvage had tropical kit but there had been no time to add rank badges and when he walked into the US officers' mess for a meal, one of the Americans accused him of not being an officer. Sauvage, in the French accent that made him so popular with the girls in the pubs of Cambridge, treated the American to an exhibition of colloquial English invective which only an officer would dare to use and encountered no further problems.

=== La Spezia raid ===
On 23 June the crews of the 52 serviceable Lancasters were briefed for the return to England, with a dusk attack on La Spezia en route. The Rodley and Sauvage crews would remain behind until Rodley's Lancaster was sufficiently repaired to take Sauvage's crew home via Gibraltar. Several main-force crews and the master bombers also had to wait for repairs. Munro and Jones were detailed to illuminate and mark La Spezia with their flares and spare TIs; their Lancasters were also armed with eight 230-kilogram (500 lb) high-explosive bombs and six 230-kilogram (500 lb) incendiary containers each. Munro took off at 7:40 p.m. to open the attack, Jones at 7:55 p.m. to follow on. The sky over La Spezia was cloudless but there was haze and the Italians seemed to put up a smoke screen. Although bomb impacts were not seen, both Pathfinder crews reported a very large explosion on the ground, possibly an oil-storage tank going up, at 11:45 p.m. The bomber force again dropped to low altitude across France and again the German night fighters failed to intercept. There were no losses; Jones reached Scampton at 4:09 a.m., Munro at 4:12 a.m., with every 5 Group bomber landing safely. The two Pathfinder crews were greeted and debriefed by senior officers at Scampton, slept for a few hours, and flew home to Bourn later that day.

== Aftermath ==
=== Analysis ===
On the day after the attack, a Mosquito photographed the target for Medmenham to assess the damage. The pictures showed that the roof of the great Zeppelin shed was intact but half of the northern wall had been blown out and the damage to the radar-antenna factory inside was likely to be severe. Two nearby factories, producing tank engines and gearboxes, had also been severely damaged. The raid had been a partial success. Later, with the aid of the bombing photographs, it was judged that only 9 per cent of the bomb loads had hit the small target area. Although 5 Group sought to claim that the Pathfinder marking was off, the Pathfinders noted that the off-target strikes were mostly to the north-east. The wind had been from the south-west and Slee's order to the main force to climb another 1,500 metres (5,000 ft) had lifted the bombers into a stronger wind. Most of the crews had not had time to assess the new drift and their bomb sights were wrongly set; 5 Group claimed that the crews using time-and-distance had bombed more accurately but later experience with this technique would suggest that the margin of error was far too great for such a small target. The bombing was concentrated in the industrial area and casualties in Friedrichshafen were relatively light, with 44 people killed.

=== Decorations ===
On 14 July, the DFCs already recommended for Jones and Munro were gazetted. On 17 August, Rodley and Sauvage were each awarded the Bar to the DFC for their actions at Friedrichshafen. Eric Suswain was awarded the Distinguished Flying Medal (DFM) and later commissioned. Rodley and Sauvage would each be awarded the Distinguished Service Order on completing their Pathfinder tours in the autumn. John Duffy would be awarded the DFM, his citation particularly mentioning his prompt action when the TI exploded aboard Rodley's bomber.

== Bibliography ==
- Air Ministry, 1944. Pilot's and Flight Engineer's Notes: Lancaster I, III and X. London, His Majesty's Stationery Office. Facsimile edition n.d. Manchester, Crecy Publishing. ISBN 978-0859790062
- Bending, Kevin, 2006. Achieve Your Aim: The History of 97 (Straits Settlements) Squadron in the Second World War. Bognor Regis, Woodfield Publishing. ISBN 978-1903953976
- Bowman, Martin W., 2014. Last of the Lancasters. Barnsley, Pen & Sword. ISBN 978-1783831746
- Brickhill, Paul, 1983. The Dam Busters. London, Pan Books. (London, Evans Brothers, 1951.) ISBN 978-0330376440
- Chorley, W. R. (1996). Royal Air Force Bomber Command Losses of the Second World War: 1943. Vol. IV. Hinckley: Midland Publishing. ISBN 978-0904597905.
- Downing, Taylor, 2011. Spies in the Sky: The Secret Battle for Aerial Intelligence During World War II. London, Little, Brown. ISBN 0349123403
- Gibson, Guy, 2003. Enemy Coast Ahead – Uncensored. Manchester, Crecy Publishing. (London, Michael Joseph, 1946.) ISBN 978-0859791182
- Harris, Marshal of the Royal Air Force Sir Arthur, 2005. Bomber Offensive. Barnsley, Pen & Sword. (London, Cassell, 1947.) ISBN 1844152103
- Holmes, Harry, 2002. Combat Legend: Avro Lancaster. Shrewsbury, Airlife Publishing. ISBN 1840373768
- Jacobs, Peter, 2017. Night Duel Over Germany: Bomber Command's Battle Over the Reich During World War II. Barnsley, Pen & Sword. ISBN 978-1783463374
- Jones, R.V., 1978. Most Secret War: British Scientific Intelligence, 1939–1945. London, Hamish Hamilton. ISBN 0241897467
- Lake, Jon, 2002. Lancaster Squadrons 1942–43. Oxford, Osprey Publishing. ISBN 1841763136
- Lawrence, W.J., 1951. No.5 Bomber Group RAF. London, Faber & Faber.
- Middlebrook, Martin, 2006. The Peenemünde Raid: 17–18 August 1943. Barnsley, Pen & Sword. (London, Allen Lane, 1982.) ISBN 1844153363
- Middlebrook, Martin; and Chris Everitt, 2000. The Bomber Command War Diaries: An Operational Reference Book 1939–1945. Leicester, Midland Publishing. ISBN 1857800338
- Millar, George, 1974. The Bruneval Raid: Flashpoint of the Radar War. London, The Bodley Head.
- Price, Alfred, 1973. Battle Over the Reich. Shepperton, Ian Allan. ISBN 0711004811
- Probert, Air Commodore Henry, 2006. Bomber Harris: His Life and Times. London, Greenhill Books. ISBN 1853676918
- June 1943, Campaign Diary, Royal Air Force, 6 April 2005, Wikidata Q131329484, archived from the original on 6 July 2007
- Sharp, C. Martin; and Michael J. F. Bowyer, 1995. Mosquito. Manchester, Crecy Publishing. (London, Faber & Faber, 1967.) ISBN 0947554416
- Verrier, Anthony, 1974. The Bomber Offensive. London, Pan Books. ISBN 0330238647
- Wilkinson, Chris, 1991. Supersheds: The Architecture of Long-Span, Large-Volume Buildings. Oxford, Butterworth Architecture. ISBN 0750612215
