= Operation Robinson =

- Part of Second World War
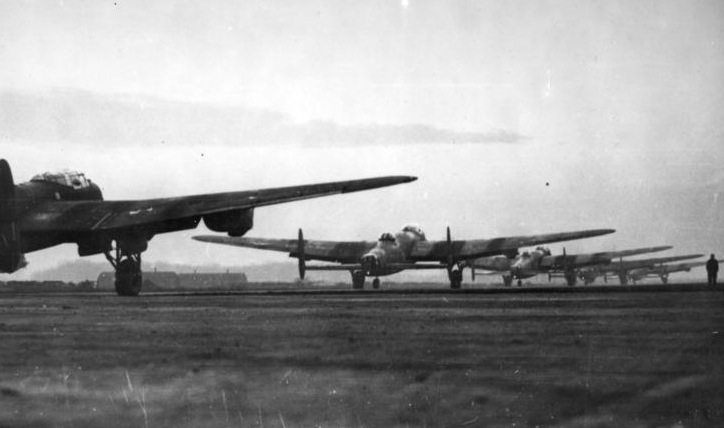
- Lancasters prepare to take off in the afternoon
Date	17 October 1942
Location	Le Creusot, France
Result	Partial British success

Belligerents
United Kingdom	(Nazi Germany) Germany

Commanders and leaders
(United Kingdom) Leonard C. Slee	

Strength
94 Lancaster bombers	

Casualties and losses
1 aircraft crashed at the target, 7 aircrew killed	63 French civilians killed
- Schneider Works out of action for 3 weeks, under repair for 8 months.

The RAF bombing raid against the Schneider Works at Le Creusot, known as Operation Robinson, was undertaken during the daylight hours of 17 October 1942. The mission was assigned to No. 5 Group, which had converted to the new Avro Lancaster. The Lancaster's large lift capacity and high speed gave reason for optimism that the raid might succeed.

== Background ==
The Schneider Works was a French plant that produced steel, rails, locomotives, artillery and other armaments. It was largely viewed as the French equivalent of Germany's Krupp Works, and was located in Le Creusot in south central France. To reach it would require flying 300 miles over occupied territory.

Bomber Command had withdrawn its aircraft from daylight attacks after suffering heavy losses attempting daylight bombing raids over the Heligoland islands in the North Sea and over France during the first half of 1940. Since that time Bomber Command operations against German industry were almost exclusively conducted under the cover of night. However, the German war effort was being supported by factories in the occupied countries as well. These targets presented a problem, as bombing them at night would necessarily result in significant casualties among civilians, whose desire to resist the occupiers was being cultivated by Britain. To strike at such targets, Bomber Command would have to attempt attacks in the clear light of day. They did so against selected targets throughout the course of the war. The Le Creusot raid was one such example.

A similar raid six months earlier against the MAN U-boat engine plant in Augsburg had not ended well. Bomber Command sent 12 Lancasters on a long run across France to attempt an accurate daylight strike against the plant. The RAF ran heavy fighter sweeps and bombing attacks on coastal targets to distract German defenses. Nevertheless, while crossing northern France the force was attacked by 20 Bf 109s and 4 of the Lancasters were shot down. Flak claimed 3 more over the target. Only 5 aircraft made it back from the raid, a 58% loss rate, and all those that did get back had suffered significant battle damage. As for the MAN plant, it continued to produce U-boat engines without apparent disruption. Daylight attacks against defended targets appeared to be no more practical in 1942 than they had been in 1940. It was hoped the high loss rate would not be repeated in the raid against the Schneider Works.

== Planning ==
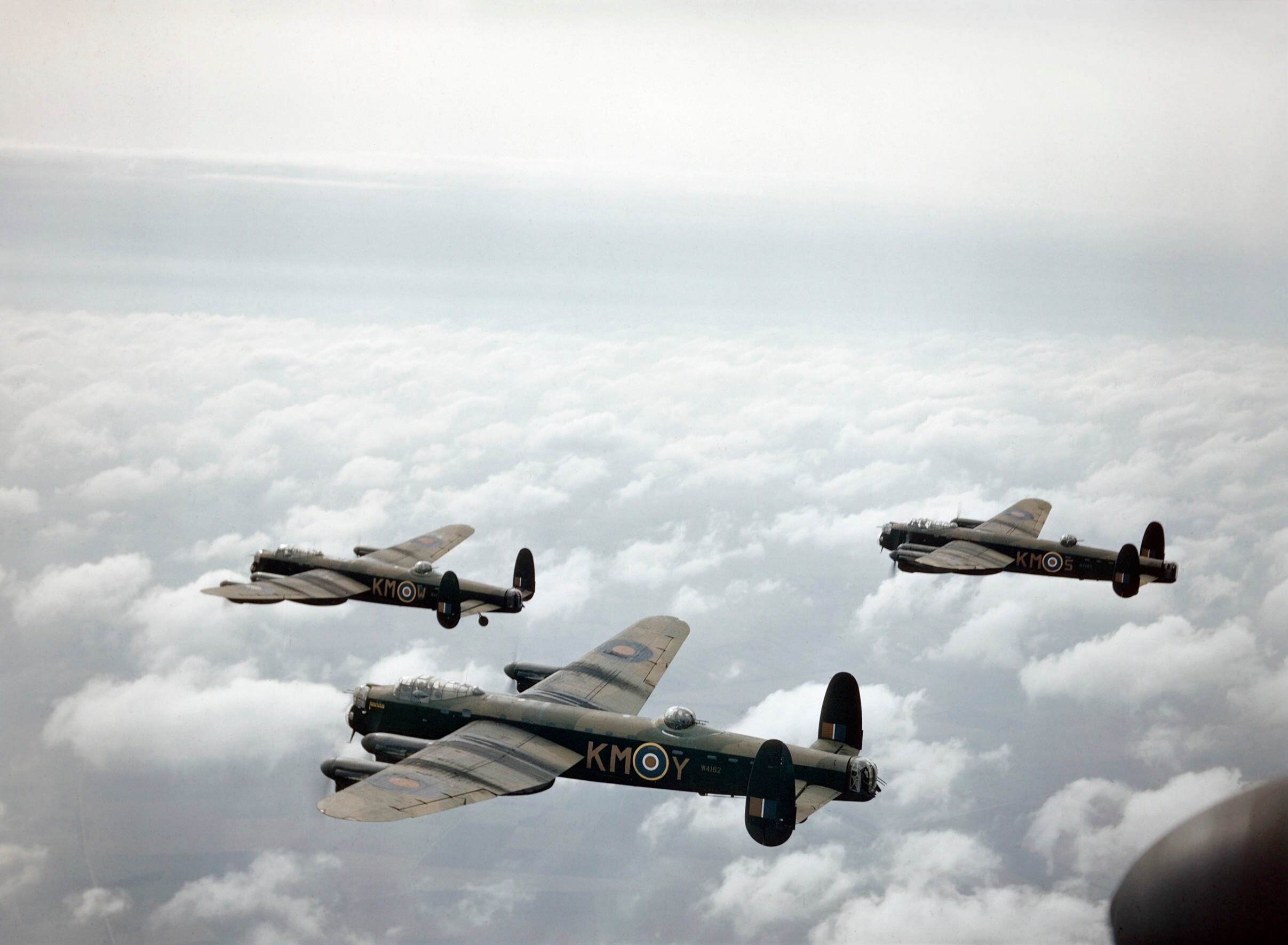
Three Lancasters of 44 Squadron flying in formation at altitude

For Arthur Harris, Bomber Command's commander in chief, the Schneider plant was the highest priority target in France. To minimize loss of life to French civilians any attack on the plant would have to be made during the day. In his arsenal he had a new bomber in service that was now coming to the force in significant numbers. A four engine aircraft, the Avro Lancaster had excellent range, a tremendous lift capacity and was fast. It was hoped that this would be enough to tip the scales in favor of the bomber crews.

Flying a direct route was out of the question. German fighter bases were concentrated in northern France, Belgium and Germany, and with no fighter escort available after the first 200 miles German fighter aircraft would decimate the attackers. The plan formulated was to take advantage of the range of the Lancaster and send the force out over the ocean, bringing them in to the target from the west. The planes would fly at low level to avoid radar detection. The aircraft would leave in the afternoon, make their attack as light faded, and then fly a direct return under the cover of darkness. It was hoped that the new aircraft would be fast enough to avoid German defenses and would carry a large enough bomb load to cause significant damage to the target.

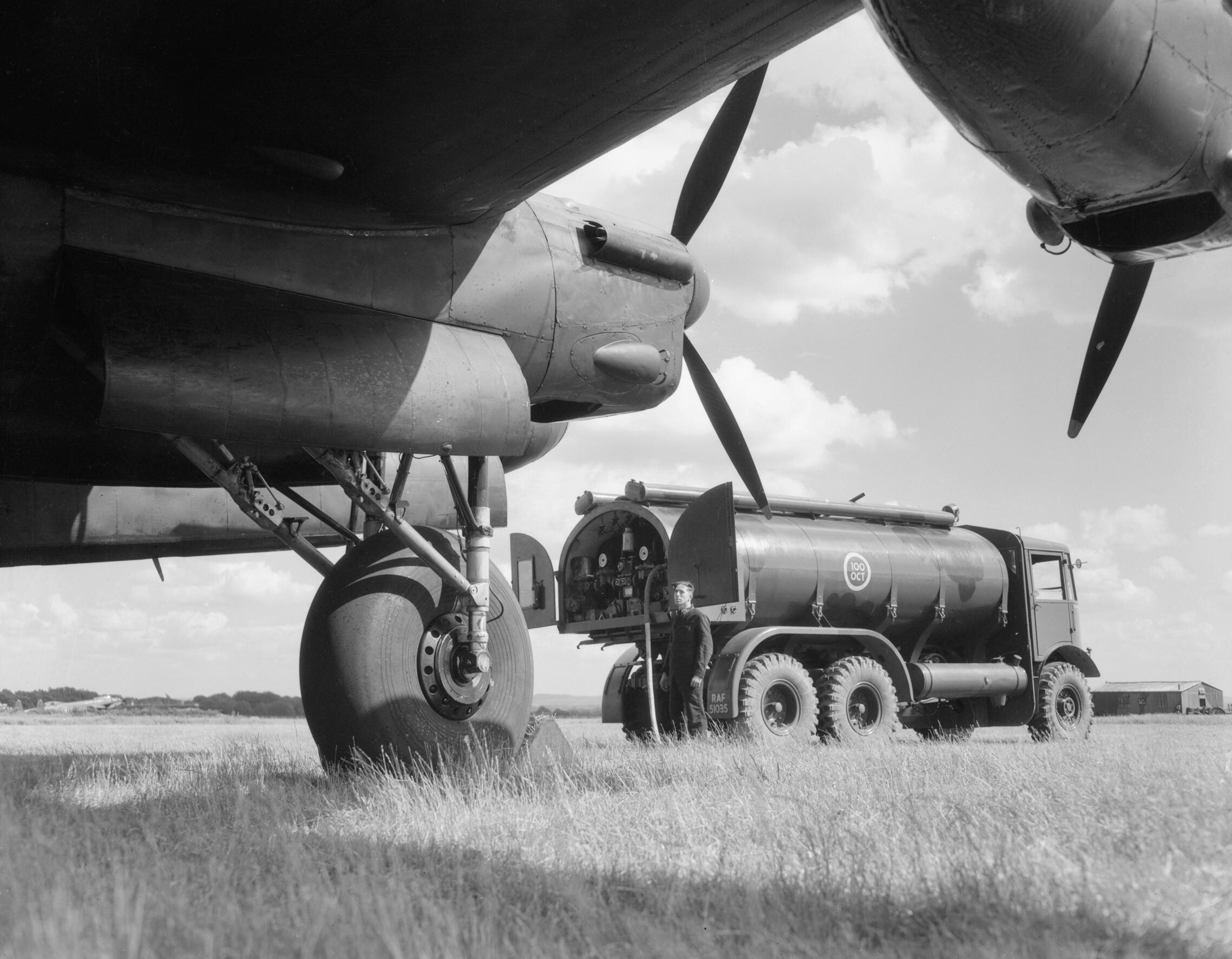
A fuel bowser completes the refueling of a Lancaster

No. 5 Group RAF was the only Group that had completed the conversion to the Lancaster. Harris assigned the entire Group, all nine squadrons, to attack the target. In early October 1942 the Group began training for the attack flying in formation and at low level.

Bomber Command crews were trained to fly on their own at altitude in trail and during the night. The crews were unfamiliar with low level flying, and they did not perform formation flying. 5 Group began to practice, starting with low numbers of aircraft flying together at low altitude and slowly building up until the entire Group was flying together in loose formation. With this strange sort of flight training there was much debate among 5 Group crews as to what the target might be. The tension was heightened by several false alarms when the aircraft were fueled, armed with bombs and placed in readiness. These were potential go days, but each time the mission had been scrubbed due to projected poor weather over the target. Harris needed clear weather over Le Creusot to give his crews the best chance of hitting the plant while avoiding French civilian casualties.

On 17 October 1942 the weather was declared right. Operation Robinson was on.

== The raid ==
94 Lancasters took off in mid-afternoon and formed up before heading south and over the ocean. 88 of the aircraft were committed to the main target, while 6 were to fly on to nearby Montchanin to knock out the coal fueled transformer station located there, which supplied electrical power to the plant.

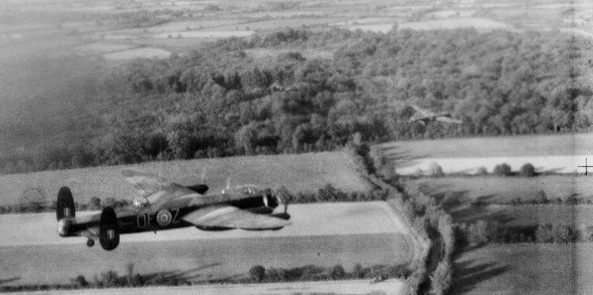
Lancasters race over the French countryside on their way to Le Creusot

The Group was led by Wing Commander L.C. Slee, the CO of 49 Squadron. Slee had been in command of 49 Squadron since 14 May 1942. Following his squadron out over the Atlantic was 9 Squadron, 44 Squadron, 50 Squadron, 57 Squadron, 61 Squadron, 97 Squadron, 106 Squadron and 207 Squadron. At the head of 106 Squadron was Guy Gibson, who would go on to fame with 617 Squadron.

The Group flew south out over the Bay of Biscay at 1,000 feet, then turned 90 degrees, dropped altitude down to 100 feet and headed in towards France. The Group flew over the island of Île d'Yeu, some 48 miles south of St. Nazaire, potentially alerting the Germans to their approach. The nearest German fighter squadron was based at Lorient, protecting U-Boats pens there. The Group reached the coast, but encountered no German response. The Lancasters flew on, racing toward their target over the 300 miles of French countryside at tree-top height. Four aircraft suffered minor damage from bird strikes and two men were injured, but the low level flying resulted in no serious accidents going in. The Group navigator brought the force right on course to the navigational pinpoint of Nevers, at the confluence of the Allier and the Loire. Here they made a slight bend to the right, placing them on track for Le Creusot. Over the last 60 miles the Group climbed, staggering the squadrons between 2,500 and 7,500 feet for the release of their bombs. They arrived at Le Creusot at dusk, with enough light to see the target, but darkness due soon to cover their retreat. They found almost no Flak over the target. Visibility was excellent and the target easily identified. The Group quickly passed overhead, with the bulk of the formation dropping its bombs over a 7-minute period while six Lancasters continued on with their loads to Montchanin. With bombs gone the crews turned north and headed for home. At the debrief most crews reported their bombing had been accurate. No aircraft were lost in the attack on the Schneider Works. At Montchanin one Lancaster came in too low, caught the roof of a building and crashed into the ground beyond.

== Results ==
Returning crews reported a successful attack and Guy Gibson's official report next day, and his subsequent account of 'one of the greatest low-level daylight raids of the war', were celebratory, as wartime morale required, but one of Gibson's flight commanders, Squadron Leader John Searby, later wrote that 'Le Creusot was a profound disappointment and he said as much on his return.' Post-strike photographs took some time to obtain. For several days the weather was unsuitable. Then, on 21 October, the photo-reconnaissance Spitfire was shot down over the target. The pilot, Flight Lieutenant Tony Hill, famed in intelligence circles for his low-level pictures of German radar installations, was pulled alive from the wreckage, but soon died of his injuries. Eventually another Spitfire made a successful run. The pictures showed that Searby's misgivings were justified and that much of the bombing had fallen short on to the workers' housing. Even so, there was considerable damage to the general machine shops and locomotive machine shops, the steel sheet and bar mills and a 650 ft warehouse which was completely destroyed. Production at the Schneider Works was halted for three weeks, and repairs continued on the plant for eight months. The raid had been well executed in most respects. The navigation by Wing Commander Slee's navigator, Pilot Officer A S Grant, was perfect. (Note: The navigator responsible for the Group maintaining the route and reaching the target on time was Pilot Officer A.S. Grant, who served as the navigator in Wing Commander Slee's lead aircraft. To accurately navigate such a long distance over water, with no land marks for position, and then over land at extremely low altitude was a considerable achievement. Grant was awarded the DSO for the accomplishment.) However bombing accuracy had been poor. Bomber Command's Operational Research Section 'thought this was partly attributable to the failing light and the smoke which soon began to drift across the target, but they also thought that the tactics adopted had been inappropriate and that the bomb sights had not been properly used. They suggested that the outcome was the penalty of employing night crews in complex daylight operations without giving them more than a few days' training.' Crews had been ordered to climb and accelerate immediately before target, which made it impossible to set the Mark IX Course Setting Bomb Sight correctly, since this sight required a long, straight and level run-up to target in order to calculate the drift and could not adjust for the aircraft's attitude. Even at fairly low height, the bombs had to be released more than a mile short of target, to allow for forward travel on the drop, and the calculations were complex. The much more advanced, computerised and gyro-stabilised Mark XIV bomb sight, with automatic input from the aircraft's flight instruments, only entered squadron service some months later. Additionally, the bombers were under-armed, carrying less than 4,000 lb each, as the Lancaster's exceptional load-carrying ability was still not fully recognised. The following month, the Lancaster's official all-up (maximum take-off) weight was increased from 60,000 lb to 63,000 lb, and after mid-1943, when the limit was raised to 65,000 lb, Lancasters would seldom carry less than an 8,000 lb bomb load, even when fully fuelled to 2,154 gallons for maximum range. After the eight months of repair works on the Schneider plant at Le Creusot had been completed, on 19/20 June 1943 Bomber Command struck again, this time in greater strength and at night: 290 bombers, mostly Halifaxes and Stirlings, attacked, about 20 per cent of the bombloads hitting the Schneider plant. Residential areas suffered heavy damage. The following night, Leonard Slee, by now a group captain, would lead Operation Bellicose, an attack by 5 and 8 Groups on a German radar factory at Friedrichshafen, with considerable success.
