= Family.Show =

Software

- Original author: Developed for Microsoft by Vertigo Software
- Release: April 2007; 19 years ago
- Stable release: 3.4 / 18 October 2020
- Written in: C#
- Operating system: Microsoft Windows
- Platform: .NET Framework
- Type: Genealogy software
- License: Microsoft Public License
- Website: www.vertigo.com/familyshow.aspx, familyshow.codeplex.com
- Repository: github.com/fredatgithub/FamilyShow

Family.Show is a free and open-source genealogy program written in C# and running on the .NET Framework. Microsoft partnered with and commissioned Vertigo Software in 2006 to create it as a reference application for Microsoft's latest UI technology and software deployment mechanism at the time, Windows Presentation Foundation and ClickOnce. The source code has originally been published on Microsoft's CodePlex website. It has since been forked and development continues independent of Microsoft on GitHub.

== Overview ==
Family.Show includes the following features:

- Data grid to edit person information.
- Add photos easily via drag-and-drop and write rich text stories about family members.
- A family tree diagram which supports panning, zooming and a time slider control to display the tree from a historical perspective.
- Multiple sequential and concurrent spousal relationships.
- Family statistics such as last name tag cloud, age distribution histogram and birthday list.
- Partial support for GEDCOM 5.5, a de facto genealogy format.
- Change the look of the entire application by choosing a different skin.

Family.Show is intended as a reference sample and not a feature complete genealogy application. Some limitations are:

- Support of a single birth and death event per person.
- No support for approximate dates (Abt. 1815, Bet. Jan 1707/08 - Jan 1708/09, Bef. 1931).

The software is licensed under the Microsoft Public License.

== File format ==
Family.Show uses an Open Package Convention file format (*.familyx) to save family data, stories, and photos in one file.

== See also ==
- ActiveDirectory.Show - Derived from Family.Show - MSDN Code Gallery
- Free software movement
