= Gradin (surname) =

Gradin or Gradín is the surname of the following people

- Anita Gradin (born 1933), Swedish politician
- Carles Poch-Gradin (born 1982), Spanish tennis player
- Isabelino Gradín (1897–1944), Uruguayan football player and athlete
- Luis Gradín, Argentine rugby union player and coach
- Peter Gradin (born 1958), Swedish ice hockey player
- Thomas Gradin (born 1956), Swedish ice hockey scout and former player

== See also ==
- Gravin
