= No. 5 Group RAF =

Former Royal Air Force operations group

No. 5 (Bomber) Group RAF ~~No. 5 (Operations) Group RAF~~
- Royal Air Force Ensign
- Active: 1 April 1918 – 15 May 1919; 1 September 1937 – 15 December 1945
- Country: United Kingdom
- Branch: Royal Air Force
- Type: Royal Air Force group
- Role: Strategic and tactical bombing
- Part of: RAF Bomber Command
- Group Headquarters: St Vincents Hall (October 1937 - November 1943); Morton Hall, Swinderby (November 1943 - December 1945)
- Motto: Undaunted

Commanders
- Notable commanders: Air Vice-Marshal Arthur Travers "Bomber" Harris; Air Vice-Marshal Ralph Cochrane

Insignia
- Group badge: A lion rampant

No. 5 Group RAF (5 Gp) was a Royal Air Force bomber group of the Second World War, led during the latter part (February 1943 – 1945) by AVM Sir Ralph Cochrane.

== History ==
Overview

The Group was formed on 1 September 1937, with its headquarters at RAF Mildenhall, in Suffolk. In October the same year, the group headquarters (HQ) was moved to St Vincents Hall in Grantham, Lincolnshire. During the Second World War, 5 Group was concentrated primarily in south Lincolnshire (whereas 1 Group was more concentrated in the north of the county). Most of the 5 Group airfields were around Lincoln, including RAF Scampton.

By the end of the Second World War, the Group had grown to 18 squadrons, 17 equipped with the Avro Lancaster and one with De Havilland Mosquitos. During the war, it also included a proportion of Royal Australian Air Force (or Australian-born RAF) personnel, both aircrews and ground staff, who were concentrated in three "Article XV squadrons": No. 455 Squadron RAAF from August 1941-April 1942; No. 463 Squadron RAAF from November 1943; and No. 467 Squadron RAAF from November 1942. The Group also famously included the elite No. 617 Squadron, perhaps better known as "The Dambusters". 617 Sqn was formed in March 1943, and comprised RAF, RAAF, RCAF and RNZAF aircrew personnel, who had been hand-picked from squadrons throughout Bomber Command.

Led by 617 Squadron, the Group often engaged in special missions, using new weapons, such as Barnes Wallis's bouncing bombs, and two type of "earthquake bomb": Tallboy and Grand Slam.

1939 – 1945

From 11 September 1939 until 22 November 1940, Air Vice Marshal (AVM) Arthur Harris was in charge. The group started the war with 10 squadrons, all equipped with the Handley Page Hampden. The Group continued to fly only Hampdens until the northern winter of 1940–1941 when it began to convert to the new Avro Manchester.

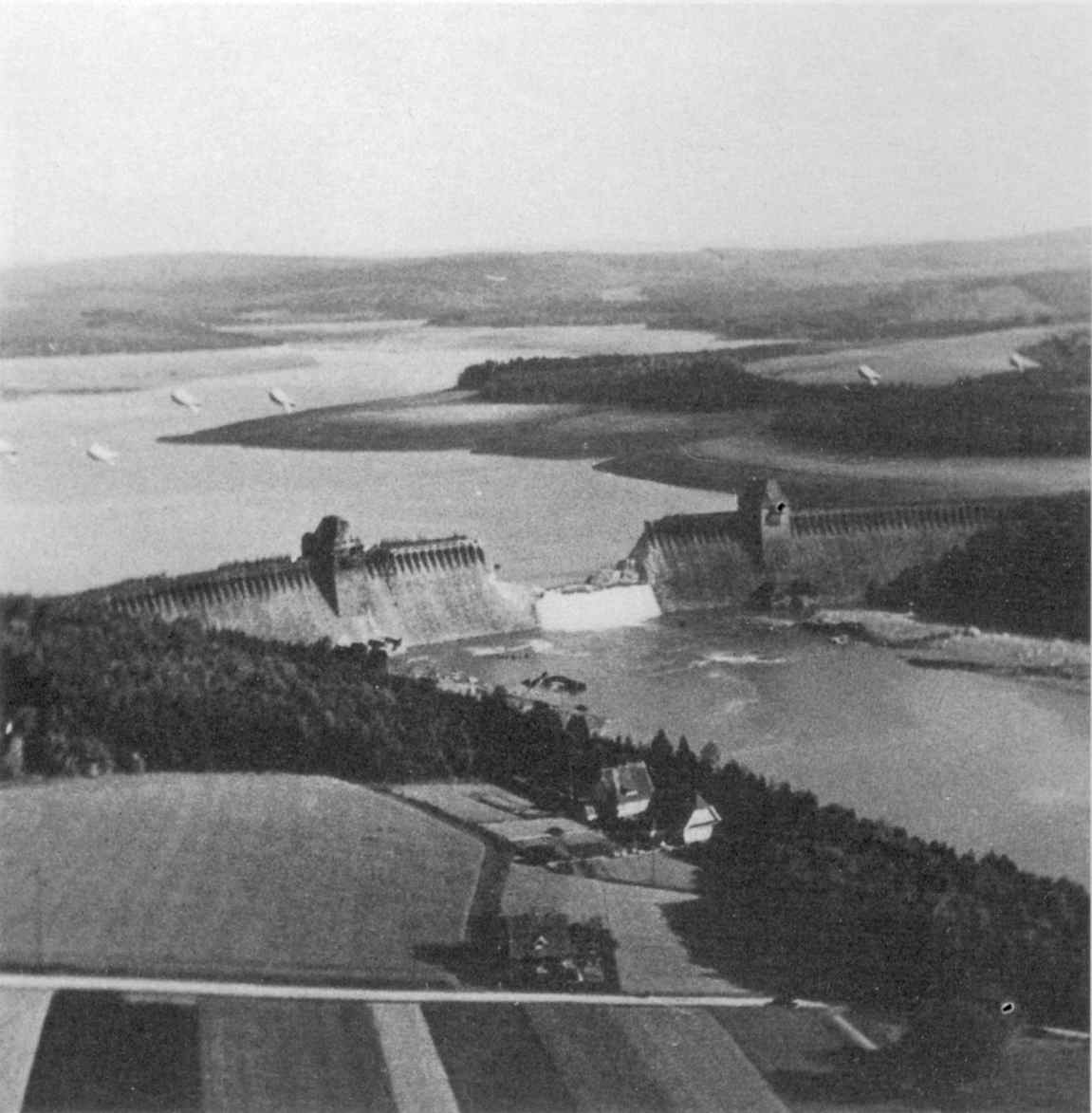
Mohne Dam destroyed in Operation Chastise, 1943

Early in 1942, the Manchester, was replaced by its four-engined variant: the Avro Lancaster, started to equip the group squadrons. On 17 October 1942, under Operation Robinson, some 86 Lancasters from 5 Group (without fighter escort) flew deep into occupied France to attack the Schneider armaments works at Le Creusot and the associated electrical station at Montchanin. On the night of 22–23 October, 85 Lancasters of the Group attacked Genoa without a single loss. On 24 October, 74 Lancasters delivered a daylight attack on Milan.

In May 1943, 617 Squadron breached two of the Ruhr dams during the famous "Dams Raid": Operation Chastise.

AVM Ralph Cochrane, who was to become influential in terms of Bomber Command tactics, took command of 5 Group in October 1943. Group HQ was moved to Morton Hall, at RAF Swinderby in November 1943,

Using the Stabilizing Automatic Bomb Sight (SABS) and the 12,000 lb (5,400 kg) Tallboy, 617 Sqn achieved a bombing error of only 94 yd (86 m) at the V Weapon launch site at Abbeville, during December 1943.

During the lead-up to D-day, Cochrane was an advocate of low-level marking, to improve accuracy, and lobbied heavily to be allowed to prove the principle operationally. New systems of target-marking were developed as result and were tested by 617 Squadron – especially its commanding officer, Wing Commander Leonard Cheshire, using the de Havilland Mosquito and North American Mustang. (Cheshire was subsequently awarded the Victoria Cross and taken off active operations). In April 1944 two Pathfinder squadrons, No. 83 and No. 97, along with No. 627 Squadron equipped with Mosquitos, were returned to 5 Group allowing them to act as an independent force using their own marking techniques.

The special missions included attacks on the German battleship Tirpitz in late 1944 and the use of the Grand Slam against the strategically-important Bielefeld railway viaduct, in March 1945.

5 Group was disbanded on 15 December 1945.

No. 5 Group controlled the following base at various times between March 1943 and November 1945
No. 51 Base	No. 52 Base	No. 53 Base	No. 54 Base	No. 55 Base	No. 56 Base
RAF Swinderby (HQ)	RAF Scampton (HQ)	RAF Waddington (HQ)	RAF Coningsby (HQ)	RAF East Kirkby (HQ)	RAF Syerston (HQ)
RAF Barkston Heath	RAF Dunholme Lodge	RAF Bardney	RAF Metheringham	RAF Spilsby	RAF Balderton
RAF Syerston	RAF Fiskerton	RAF Skellingthorpe	RAF Woodhall Spa	RAF Strubby	RAF Fulbeck
RAF Wigsley					
RAF Winthorpe					

== Notable raids ==
- First "thousand-bomber attack" on Cologne on 30 May 1942 (shared)
- "Dambuster" attack on the dams at the Möhne Reservoir, the Edersee and Sorpedam on 17 May 1943 (without backup)
- Operation Bellicose, the first ‘shuttle raid’ of the war, against rocket facilities near Lake Constance and shipping at La Spezia Naval Base via Tunisia, in June 1943.
- Operation Hydra against the Peenemünde Army Research Center on 17 August 1943
- Attack on Königsberg, 29 August 1944
- Attack on Braunschweig, 15 October 1944 (without backup)
- Attack on Heilbronn, 4 December 1944 (without backup)
- Attack on Dresden on 13 February 1945 (without backup on the first attack)
- Grand Slam attack on Schildesche viaduct near Bielefeld on 14 March 1945 (without backup)
- Attack on Würzburg, 16 March 1945 (shared)
- Attack on the oil refinery at Tønsberg in Southern Norway, the last raid by heavy bombers of Bomber Command in World War II.

== Commanders ==
1918 to 1919

- 1 April 1918 Lieutenant Colonel Frederick Halahan
- May 1918 Brigadier-General Charles Laverock Lambe

1937 to 1945

- 17 August 1937 Air Commodore William Bertram Callaway
- 11 September 1939 Air Vice-Marshal Arthur Travers Harris
- 22 November 1940 Air Vice-Marshal Norman Bottomley
- 12 May 1941 Air Vice-Marshal John Slessor
- 25 April 1942 Air Vice-Marshal Alec Coryton
- 28 February 1943 Air Vice-Marshal Ralph Cochrane
- 16 January 1945 Air Vice-Marshal Hugh Constantine

== See also ==
- List of Royal Air Force groups
