= Gravin van Buren =

Coordinates: 51°54′41.13″N 5°20′4.56″E

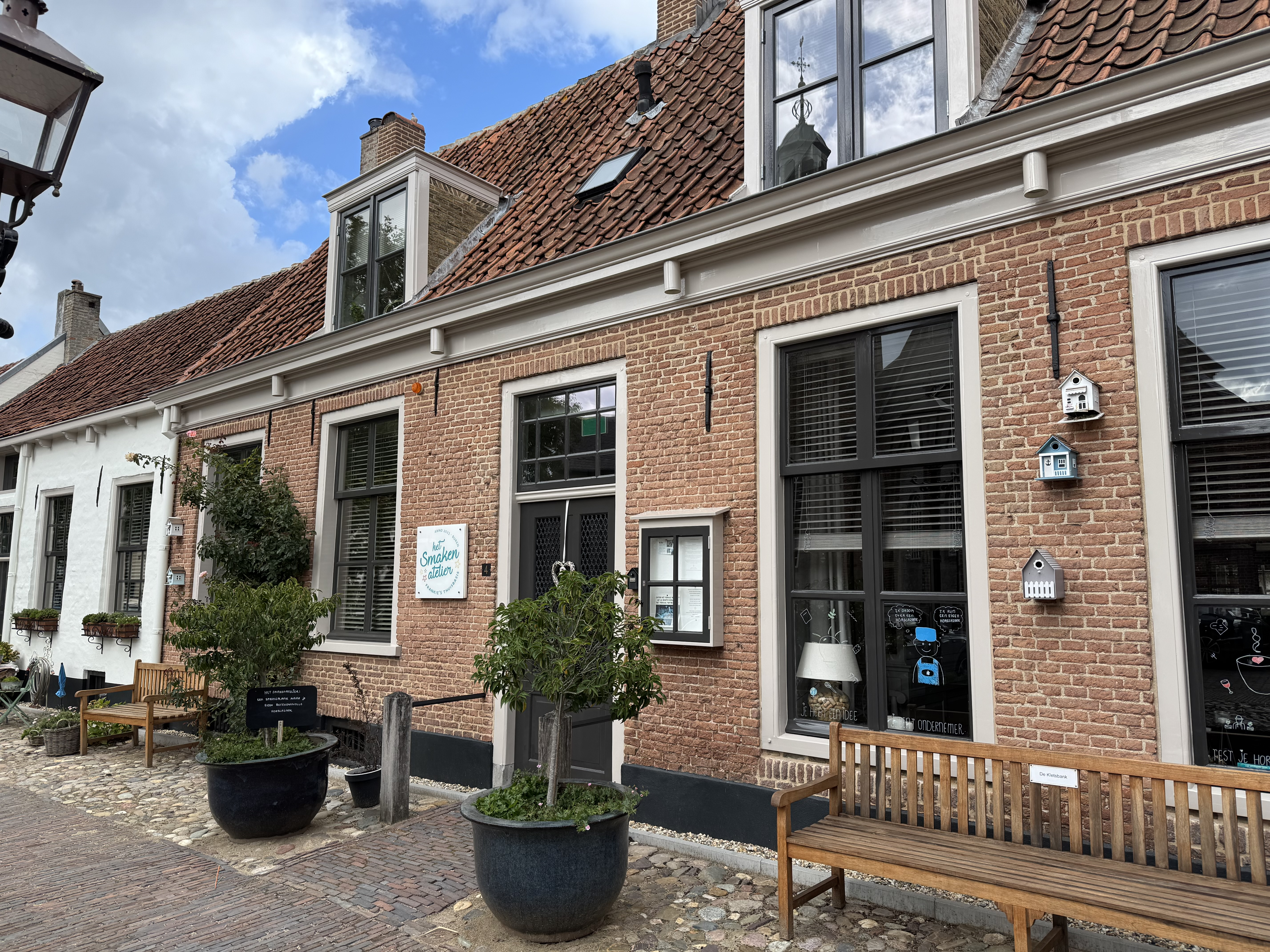
- The building, shown here in 2025, where the restaurant was located
- Interactive map of Gravin van Buren

Restaurant information
- Established: 6 December 1981
- Closed: 2011
- Chef: Walter Bloier
- Food type: French
- Rating: Michelin Guide
- Location: Kerkstraat 4, Buren, 4116 BL, Netherlands
- Seating capacity: 70

Restaurant Gravin van Buren is a defunct restaurant in Buren, in the Netherlands. It was a fine dining restaurant that was awarded one Michelin star in 1986 and retained that rating until 1995.

Owner and head chef was Austrian Walter Bloier.

Gravin van Buren is a former member of the Alliance Gastronomique Néerlandaise. Bloier changed course with his restaurant in 2007 and therefore ended the membership.

In 2011, Bloier closed down the restaurant and retired.

== See also ==
- List of Michelin starred restaurants in the Netherlands
