= Oil mist =

Oil droplets suspended in air

Oil mist refers to oil droplets suspended in the air in the size range 1~10 μm.

== Formation of oil mist ==
Oil mist may form when high pressure fuel oil, lubricating oil, hydraulic oil, or other oil is sprayed through a narrow crack, or when leaked oil connects with a high temperature surface, vaporizes, and comes in contact with low air temperature.

This happens while the fluids interact with the moving parts during machining.

Smaller oil droplets than oil mist are difficult to generate under normal circumstances.

Bigger oil droplets than oil mist remain in spray form; this has the advantage of a higher ignition temperature. It sinks easily, reducing fire hazard. Oil mist inside the crankcase can cause a bigger problem.

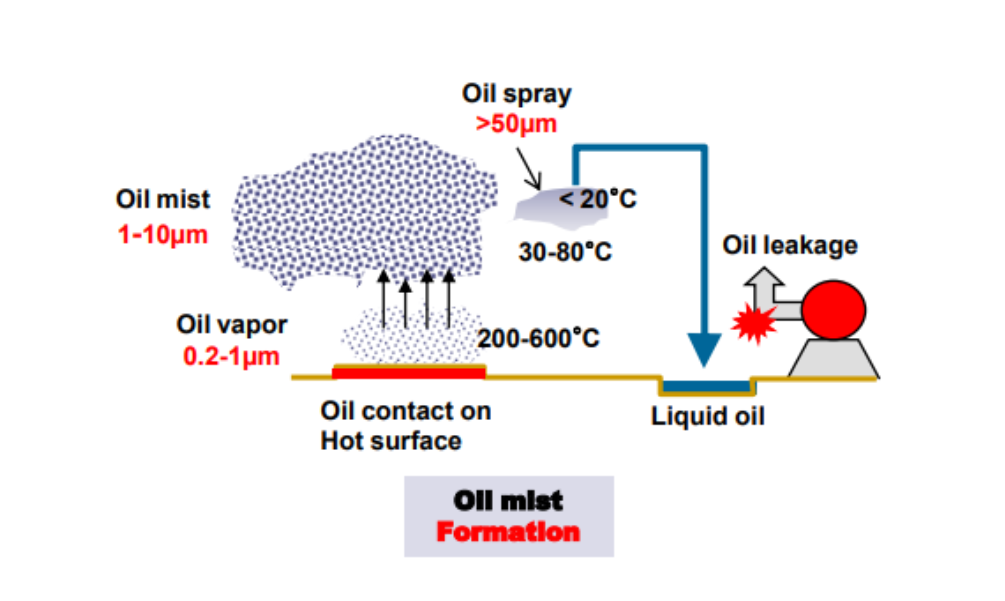
How Oil Mist is formed

== Risks ==
When the concentration of oil mist increases and reaches the lower explosion limit (LEL; 50 mg/ℓ, as defined by the IACS), explosion may occur when the mist contacts surfaces of over 200 °C (392 °F) or a spark.

The International Association of Classification Societies (IACS) mandates that all ships with a cylinder diameter greater than 300mm or engine power over 2,250 kW must be equipped with either bearing temperature detectors or oil mist detectors.

In regards to occupational exposures, the Occupational Safety and Health Administration and the National Institute for Occupational Safety and Health have set occupational exposure limits at 5 ppm over an eight-hour time-weighted average, with a short-term exposure limit at 10 ppm.

== Related accidents ==
- 2010 Puebla oil pipeline explosion : The 2010 Puebla oil pipeline explosion was a large oil pipeline explosion in Mexico. In the central part of Mexico, 28 people were killed by the explosion.
