= Spanish ship Gravina =

Various Spanish Navy ships

Four ships of the Spanish Navy have borne the name Gravina, after the Italian-Spanish admiral Federico Carlos Gravina y Nápoli (1756–1806):

- Gravina, a 16-gun brigantine launched in 1851 and decommissioned in 1867.
- Gravina, a Velasco-class unprotected cruiser commissioned in 1881 and wrecked in 1884.
- Gravina (1931), a Churruca-class destroyer commissioned in 1936, decommissioned in 1963, and sold in 1964.
- Gravina (D62), formerly USS Furse (DD-882/DDR-882), a Gearing-class destroyer acquired in 1972 and decommissioned and scrapped in 1991.
