= Microsoft Semblio =

Microsoft Semblio is a software development kit for development of rich educational software. Version 1.0 was published by Microsoft on 15 December 2008. Before its launch it was codenamed Grava, to become a set of tools for creating and using educational and training materials.

== Components ==
The tools were to be built using WPF and consists of the following components:

- Grava SDK: The Grava SDK is built on top of WPF and provides a programming model consistent with it. It also includes a set of services for assessment and logging results.
- Grava Authoring: The Grava authoring tool can be used to create interactive training material using GUI-based authoring. It can be used to create wizard like content or follow non-linear content creation. It integrates with developer tools like Microsoft Visual Studio.
- Grava Player: The Grava player can play back interactive Grava content, and can use the logging and assessment services to track the progress of the trainee.

== Application ==
The Microsoft Semblio SDK is built on the .NET Framework 3.5, and is intended to provide developers with tools for packaging and distribution of rich interactive learning material, such as e-books containing images, audio, and video. Version 1.0 of the SDK can be freely downloaded from Microsoft.

The SDK is the first of three components that will make up the Semblio Platform. The other two includes an assembly tool and a media player.

The Semblio file format (.semblio) is based on ISO/IEC 29500-2:2008 Open Packaging Conventions.

== See also ==
- Office Open XML
