= Graviner =

British engineering company

Graviner is a British engineering company that makes oxygen (life support) and fire extinguishing systems for civil and military aircraft. The name is a portmanteau of gravity and inertia.

== History ==
The company was independently operational from 1933 to 1980 and is now a component of United Technologies Corporation (UTC).

=== Explosion suppression ===
In the 1930s, as the Graviner Manufacturing Company in Gosport, it made the Graviner Extinguisher, an explosion-suppression system, which operated to prevent fuel from catching fire in an aircraft crash. The system deployed the compound carbon tetrachloride, the forerunner to the modern gaseous extinguishing agents collectively referred to as Halon.

=== Fire detection ===
In the early 1950s it made a product called Graviner Firewire which detected fires onboard aircraft. The company was now based in Buckinghamshire. The Graviner Firewire extinguisher system was also used extensively by British Rail. All Diesel Multiple Units (referred to as 'Railcars' at the time) built in the 1950s and 1960s, had the system installed around the underfloor mounted engines and transmissions. Thousands of the systems were installed beneath every DMU 'Power-car' built by British Rail workshops and by private contractors. The original systems remained in use right up until the last units were withdrawn from the, by now Privatised National Rail system in the early 2000s, and remains installed on the many preserved DMUs on heritage railways, although most have had the original extinguishing medium (CTC) replaced with non-toxic, modern Halon based medium. In July 1966 it won the contract to provide fire detection and suppression systems for Concorde. It also made fire detection systems for marine craft; it makes a well-known oil mist detector. In 1983 it provided the fire detection and suppression systems for the world land speed record car Thrust2.

In 1984 it introduced the world's first microprocessor-controlled engine fire detection system. By the 1980s, half of the world's Boeing 747s carried its technology.

In 1991 it won a contract to provide the fire detection systems for the experimental Lockheed YF-22, which subsequently evolved many years later into the Lockheed Martin F-22 Raptor, entering service with the USAF around 2006.

=== Nuclear energy ===
By the early 1960s it had a nuclear energy division.

== Ownership ==
In the 1950s H.B. Randolph, owner of Wilkinson Sword, acquired a majority interest in Graviner and built a corporate research laboratory at the Graviner Colnbrook facility. Randolph used Graviner as a pool of talent for his rapidly expanding international razor blade operations. Wilkinson maintained ownership until the 1980s. In the 1980s, it was owned by Allegheny International. By the 1980s, it was part of the same group as a similar company, Deugra, based near Düsseldorf. It was bought, with Deugra, for £24m in 1986 by RHP Group (bearings). By the late 1980s, RHP Group had become Pilgrim House Group.

The company is now part of United Technologies Corporation (UTC). The business at Colnbrook closed on 21 December 2017. Production was transferred to a sister company, L'Hotellier in Paris.

== See also ==
- Darchem Engineering, of Stockton-On-Tees, makes fire suppression systems.
- Pains Wessex, a former British company which made similar life-saving equipment
- Category:Airliner accidents and incidents caused by in-flight fires
