= Shuttle bombing =

WWII bombing tactic

Shuttle bombing is a tactic where bombers fly from their home base to bomb a first target and continue to a different location where they are refuelled and rearmed. The aircraft may then bomb a second target on the return leg to their home base. Some examples of operations which have used this tactic are:

- The Doolittle Raid, 18 April 1942: 16 B-25s of the 17th Bombardment Group bombed Tokyo from the USS Hornet, with the intent to land in various locations in Eastern China.
- The Battle of Stalingrad, September 1942: Luftflotte 4 of the Luftwaffe employed shuttle bombing tactics during the intense aerial bombardment of the city in the early days of the battle.
- Operation Bellicose, June 1943: On the night of 20/21 June the RAF bombers departed from their bases in the United Kingdom and bombed Friedrichshafen, landing in Algeria, where they refuelled and rearmed. On the return leg they bombed the Italian naval base at La Spezia.
- Schweinfurt–Regensburg mission, 17 August 1943: The 4th Bombardment Wing of the Eighth Air Force using B-17s equipped with "Tokyo (fuel) tanks" for longer range, attacked the Messerschmitt Bf 109 plants in Regensburg and then flew on to bases in Bône, Berteaux and Telergma (French Algeria). Most of the aircraft that had been damaged were stranded due to the poor repair facilities in Algeria and some of them were never returned to service. Eight days later, on 24 August, on the way back to their bases in Great Britain, the surviving B-17s bombed targets in Bordeaux.
- Operation Frantic, from June to September 1944: This was a series of air raids conducted by United States Army Air Forces (USAAF) bombers based in Britain or the Mediterranean which then landed at bases built by the Americans in Ukraine in the Soviet Union. As a military operation it made possible eighteen strong attacks on important strategic targets in Germany which would otherwise have been immune.
- The Warsaw Airlift, August to September 1944: During the Warsaw Uprising the Frantic airbases were used for an airdrop to the Poles fighting in the city. On 17 September 1944 70 B-17s and 57 P-51s flew without bombs from Italy and landed safely in the United Kingdom. On 18 September 107 of 110 B-17s dropped 1,248 containers of supplies to Polish forces in Warsaw and flew on to the USSR losing one B-17 with seven more damaged. The next day 100 B-17s and 61 P-51s left the USSR and bombed the marshalling yard at Szolnok in Hungary as they returned to bases in Italy.
- Operation Paravane, September 1944: A variation on the concept. On 11 September 1944 No. 9 Squadron RAF and No. 617 Squadron RAF flew from their home bases in Scotland to a temporary base at Yagodnik, near Arkhangelsk in the Soviet Union. From there, on 15 September, they bombed the German battleship Tirpitz in a Norwegian fjord and continued on back to Scotland.

While shuttle bombing offered several advantages, allowing distant targets to be hit and complicating the Axis defence arrangements, it posed a number of practical difficulties, not least the awkward relations between the Western Allies and the Soviet Union. Allied shuttle bombing operations were concluded in September 1944 after a three-month period and not repeated.
