= William Brill (RAAF officer) =

Royal Australian Air Force officer

William Lloyd Brill
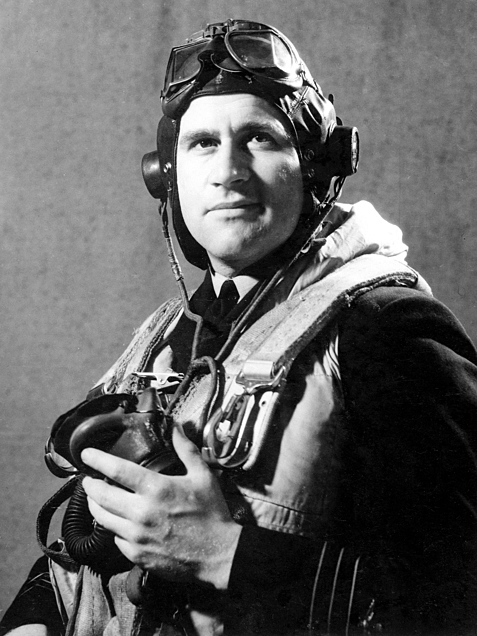
- Wing Commander Brill, July 1944
- Born: 17 May 1916; Ganmain, New South Wales
- Died: 12 October 1964 (aged 48); Campbell, Australian Capital Territory
- Military career
- Allegiance: Australia
- Branch: Australian Military Forces; Royal Australian Air Force
- Service years: 1939–64
- Rank: Group Captain
- Units: 21st Light Horse (1939–40); No. 460 Squadron (1942); No. 463 Squadron (1944)
- Commands: No. 467 Squadron (1944); No. 10 Squadron (1949–50); Officer Training School (1953–56); RAAF Base Canberra (1959); RAAF Base Townsville (1964)
- Conflicts: World War II; European Theatre; Battle of Berlin
- Awards: Distinguished Service Order; Distinguished Flying Cross & Bar
- Other work: Farmer

William Lloyd Brill, DSO, DFC & Bar (17 May 1916 – 12 October 1964) was a senior officer and bomber pilot in the Royal Australian Air Force (RAAF). Born in the Riverina district of New South Wales, he was a farmer and a member of the Militia before joining the RAAF in 1940. After training in Australia and Canada, he was posted to Britain in 1941 to take part in the air war over Europe. Brill first saw combat with No. 460 Squadron RAAF, flying Vickers Wellington medium bombers. He was awarded the Distinguished Flying Cross (DFC) in May 1942 for attacking a target after his plane was badly damaged by anti-aircraft fire. Following assignment as an instructor with the Royal Air Force (RAF), he returned to the bombing campaign in January 1944 as a flight commander with No. 463 Squadron RAAF, flying Avro Lancaster heavy bombers.

Brill's leadership and determination to complete his missions despite damage to his aircraft—on one occasion inflicted by another Lancaster's bombs from above—earned him the Distinguished Service Order. Promoted to wing commander in May 1944, he took over No. 467 Squadron RAAF after the death in combat of its then-commander, Group Captain John Balmer. Brill was awarded a bar to his DFC in July, for his skill in evading three German night fighters. Returning to Australia, he remained in the Air Force after the war and led No. 10 Squadron in 1949–50. He went on to command air bases at Rathmines, Canberra and Townsville during the 1950s and 1960s. Brill served two terms as RAAF Director of Personnel Services, in 1956–59 and 1960–63, by which time he had been promoted to group captain. His final posting was at the Department of Air in Canberra. He died of a heart attack in October 1964.

== Early life ==
Brill was born on 17 May 1916 in the Riverina town of Ganmain, New South Wales. He was the fourth of seven children of farmer Edward Brill and his wife Bertha, who were originally from Victoria. The Brills owned a property called "Clearview", and Bill attended the local school. He completed his education at Yanco Agricultural High, gaining his Intermediate Certificate before joining his brothers in wheat farming. Thickly set and physically strong, he was a keen Australian rules footballer, playing for Ganmain, Grong Grong, and Matong. On 5 January 1939, Brill enlisted in the 21st Light Horse Regiment, a Militia unit, at Narrandera. He was promoted to corporal in May. The previous month he had been tested as a potential air cadet, the interview panel finding him a "quiet country chap" who was "rather slow" but "intelligent".

On 11 November 1940, Brill transferred to the RAAF active reserve, known as the Citizen Air Force (CAF). He went through the Empire Air Training Scheme (EATS), undergoing initial instruction at RAAF Bradfield Park in Sydney. Selected to be a pilot, he received his elementary flying training on De Havilland Tiger Moths at RAAF Station Narrandera. In March 1941, Brill was posted to Canada for advanced instruction on Avro Ansons at No. 3 Service Flying Training School, Calgary. He was commissioned as a pilot officer on 28 July 1941, and sailed to Britain the next month. In October he began converting to Vickers Wellington medium bombers at No. 27 Operational Training Unit, Lichfield, and was assigned to No. 460 Squadron RAAF, which formed at RAF Molesworth the following month.

== Air war in Europe ==
=== First tour of operations ===
Raised under the Article XV provisions of EATS, No. 460 Squadron was one of several nominally Australian formations taking part in RAF Bomber Command's strategic air campaign against Germany. In January 1942, the unit moved from Molesworth to RAF Breighton, Yorkshire. Brill flew as a co-pilot in No. 460 Squadron's first operation, against the German port of Emden in March. He was soon in command of his own Wellington, attacking targets in northern France. On 5 April 1942, he undertook his first sortie against a well-defended city deep in enemy territory, Cologne. He later recorded his apprehension before the raid:

How can I get back from this when others who are better than I'll ever be, have fallen on such targets? Will I funk if I'm in a tight spot? Will I let the rest of the boys down? Who am I to hold the lives of five other men in my hands?

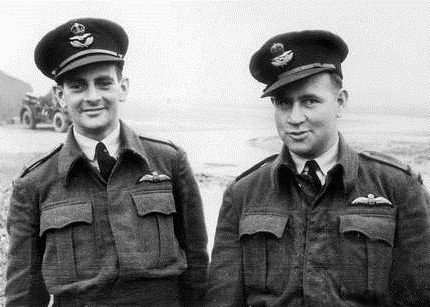
Pilot Officer Brill (right) with fellow No. 460 Squadron pilot Arthur Doubleday at Molesworth, England, c. 1941–42

On the night of 29/30 May 1942, Brill's was one of 27 aircraft detailed to bomb the Gnome et Rhône, Thomson Houston, and Goodrich factories in the Paris suburb of Gennevilliers. The crews were required to have good visibility of the target area before bombing, to ensure accuracy and reduce civilian casualties. Due to foul weather over the Channel, Brill flew at an altitude of less than 200 feet (60 m) until crossing the French coast. The clouds had begun to clear over Paris and searchlights swept the sky, accompanied by heavy anti-aircraft fire. Most of the bombers released their loads from between 4,000 and 8,000 feet (1,200 and 2,400 m), but Brill dropped to 1,500 feet (460 m) before making his attack. With the bomb bay doors open, his Wellington was struck by flak, damaging the hydraulics and rear gun turret, and leaving one of the 1,000 lb (450 kg) bombs hanging after the others dropped on target. Returning to England through more bad weather, he spotted an emergency landing ground and brought the crippled Wellington down with the bomb doors still open and one tyre flat; the plane was later scrapped. Brill's was the only one of four Wellingtons from No. 460 Squadron to find the target area and successfully attack. For his "splendid courage and determination" in pressing home the assault, he was awarded the Distinguished Flying Cross on 26 June, the first pilot in his squadron to be decorated.

No. 460 Squadron participated in 1,000-bomber raids against Cologne, Essen and Bremen in May and June 1942. Brill was promoted to acting flight lieutenant in July, and completed his first tour of operations, numbering 31 sorties, on 11 August. He was seconded to the RAF as an instructor in November 1942, returning to No. 27 Operational Training Unit at Lichfield. He spent the next eleven months there, leading a training flight and gaining promotion to acting squadron leader in April 1943. In August, he was best man at the wedding of his friend and fellow RAAF pilot, Arthur Doubleday. The press would come to refer to the pair as the "Flying Twins", as their wartime careers closely paralleled one another—both men came from the Riverina district, joined the Air Force together on Remembrance Day 1940, arrived in England in August 1941, flew Wellingtons in No. 460 Squadron, volunteered for second tours in Bomber Command, and received many decorations and promotions in tandem. Doubleday would go on to survive the war and become active in civil aviation.

=== Second tour of operations ===
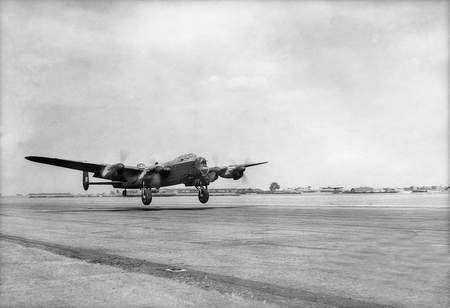
No. 463 Squadron Lancaster, RAF Waddington

Having volunteered for his second tour, Brill underwent conversion to Handley Page Halifax and Avro Lancaster heavy bombers in the last months of 1943. In the new year, he was appointed a flight commander in No. 463 Squadron RAAF, operating Lancasters out of RAF Waddington, Lincolnshire. Waddington was also home to another Australian squadron, No. 467, and Brill took an active part in the station's raucous mess life. His younger brother Vic, who had joined the RAAF in 1941, was in the same squadron. Brill returned to combat in the middle of the Battle of Berlin, flying his first sortie to the "Big City" on 20 January 1944. The statistical likelihood of surviving an operational tour of 30 missions in Bomber Command was never more than 50%, but loss rates during the Battle of Berlin were far higher.

Brill took off for his second mission to Berlin on 27 January. The Lancaster he flew was said to be jinxed, possessed of an engine that lost power in the air but always tested well on the ground, and suffering oxygen failure that killed its rear gunner on the previous sortie. One of the engines did begin to falter before Brill reached Berlin, forcing him to fly lower than normal. Having released his bombs over target, he felt the plane take several strikes that he assumed were anti-aircraft fire but were in fact the incendiaries of a Lancaster flying above. His aircraft's nose, rudder controls, and electricals were all severely damaged, and the port wing was on fire. Having warned his crew to prepare to bail out, Brill dived the Lancaster and succeeded in putting out the flames. The crew was able to remain on board and, after a nine-hour flight, the plane landed back at Waddington. Brill's verdict on the mission was, he wrote later, "not my idea of an evening's entertainment". He flew eleven operations during the Battle of Berlin, including Bomber Command's costliest raid of the war, against Nuremberg in March. On that occasion, one of his engines failed and another was damaged when he had to fly through a cloud of debris from a Lancaster that was blown to pieces directly in his path.

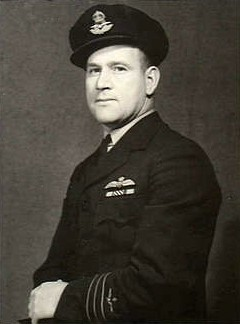
Wing Commander Brill as commanding officer of No. 467 Squadron RAAF, July 1944

By April 1944, No. 463 Squadron had begun to concentrate on targets in France and Belgium as the Allied air campaign shifted focus from strategic bombing to destroying airfields and disrupting lines of communication before the invasion of the continent. On 8 May, Brill was the bombing controller for a raid on an airfield near Brest. The controller was required to arrive ahead of the main Allied force, check that flares marking the target were in place, and warn his fellows if they were bombing inaccurately. By the time Brill had completed this task and gone in himself to attack, the ground defences were fully alert and peppered his Lancaster with 140 bullet holes, but he refused to take evasive action until he had delivered his bombload. Promoted to acting wing commander, Brill assumed control of No. 467 Squadron on 12 May, following the death in combat of its previous commanding officer, Group Captain John Balmer. According to the official history of the RAAF in World War II, Brill "proved a very worthy successor to Balmer both in administration and in the dashing type of leadership which had brought the Waddington squadrons to the fore in No. 5 Group". He was awarded the Distinguished Service Order on 19 May for "leadership, skill and gallantry of the highest order" and "his determination to make every sortie a success" in spite of frequent damage to his aircraft. Early the next month he led No. 467 Squadron in raids on Axis radar stations in northern France. The unit was in action on D-Day over Pointe du Hoc and, later, clearing a corridor for Allied troops advancing up the Cherbourg peninsula.

On the night of 4/5 July, Nos. 463 and 467 Squadrons bombed supply depots for V-weapons near Saint-Leu-d'Esserent. Brill's Lancaster was attacked by three German night fighters, but he was able to evade them with only a few bullets striking his plane. His "fine leadership and courage" during the action earned him a bar to his DFC; the award was promulgated in The London Gazette on 16 January 1945. Brill completed his second tour of operations later in July but stayed on to fly more missions, often mentoring less experienced crews. By now he had earned a reputation for being quite "mad", as he would often circle back and check over his handiwork after a bombing run, rather than making his escape from the target area as quickly as possible. During non-operational periods, he made a habit of taking a Lancaster on a so-called test flight to the southern border of Northern Ireland, where he and his crew would change into civilian clothes, cross into Ireland and stock up on food and liquor for a party back at Waddington; he always made a point of inviting the Air Officer Commanding RAAF Overseas Headquarters, Air Vice Marshal Henry Wrigley, to such events, which Wrigley attended without fail. Brill handed over command of No. 467 Squadron on 12 October 1944, becoming the first man to survive his time as its leader. He had flown a total of 58 missions in Bomber Command when he returned to Australia in the new year. On 29 January 1945 he married Ilma Kitto, a teacher, at Ganmain's Methodist Church. The couple had been engaged since before the war; they later had two sons and a daughter.

== Post-war career ==
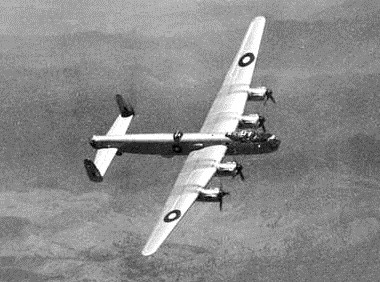
Australian-built Avro Lincoln, c. November 1946

Brill remained in the Air Force following the end of hostilities. From February 1946 to August 1947 he served as the first and only commanding officer of the RAAF's newly formed and soon-disbanded Heavy Bomber Crew Conversion Unit at RAAF Station East Sale, Victoria. Little support or direction on its use as a training facility was forthcoming from higher command, and in the summer months its Avro Lincoln bombers were employed in bushfire patrols over East Gippsland, reporting 44 outbreaks in February 1947 alone. Brill transferred from the CAF to the Permanent Air Force in 1948, and reverted to the rank of squadron leader. In March 1949 he became the inaugural commanding officer of a re-formed No. 10 (General Reconnaissance) Squadron, which had been disbanded in 1945 after service throughout World War II. In its new guise the squadron was established from the staff and facilities of RAAF Station Garbutt in Townsville. Brill's main tasks were organising to absorb or close surplus wartime facilities in North Queensland and preparing No. 10 Squadron for search-and-rescue operations. The unit took delivery of its first four Lincoln Mk 30s in September 1949, and Brill handed over command the following January.

Raised to substantive wing commander, Brill served as a director at RAAF Staff College in Point Cook, Victoria, until his appointment as Staff Officer to the Chief of the Air Staff, Air Marshal Sir Donald Hardman, in March 1952. He was posted to command the Officer Training School (OTS) at RAAF Base Rathmines, New South Wales, in December 1953. In this role he was also the commanding officer of the base. His title changed in May 1956 as Rathmines and OTS were reorganised under the newly established RAAF School of Ground Training, Brill taking charge of the school until July. Considered an empathetic leader, he then became Director of Personnel Services. Promoted to group captain, Brill served throughout 1959 as commanding officer of RAAF Base Canberra before again being appointed Director of Personnel Services. Active in local charities and youth organisations, he became a Freemason and in the early 1960s was assistant commissioner for the Canberra–Monaro Boy Scouts. In January 1964 he assumed command of RAAF Base Townsville, returning to Canberra that October for assignment to the Department of Air. He died of a heart attack at his home in Campbell on 12 October. Survived by his wife and children, Brill was buried in Canberra. He is commemorated by Brill Place, in Gowrie.
