= Australian contribution to the Battle of Normandy =

Australians who fought in Normandy in WWII

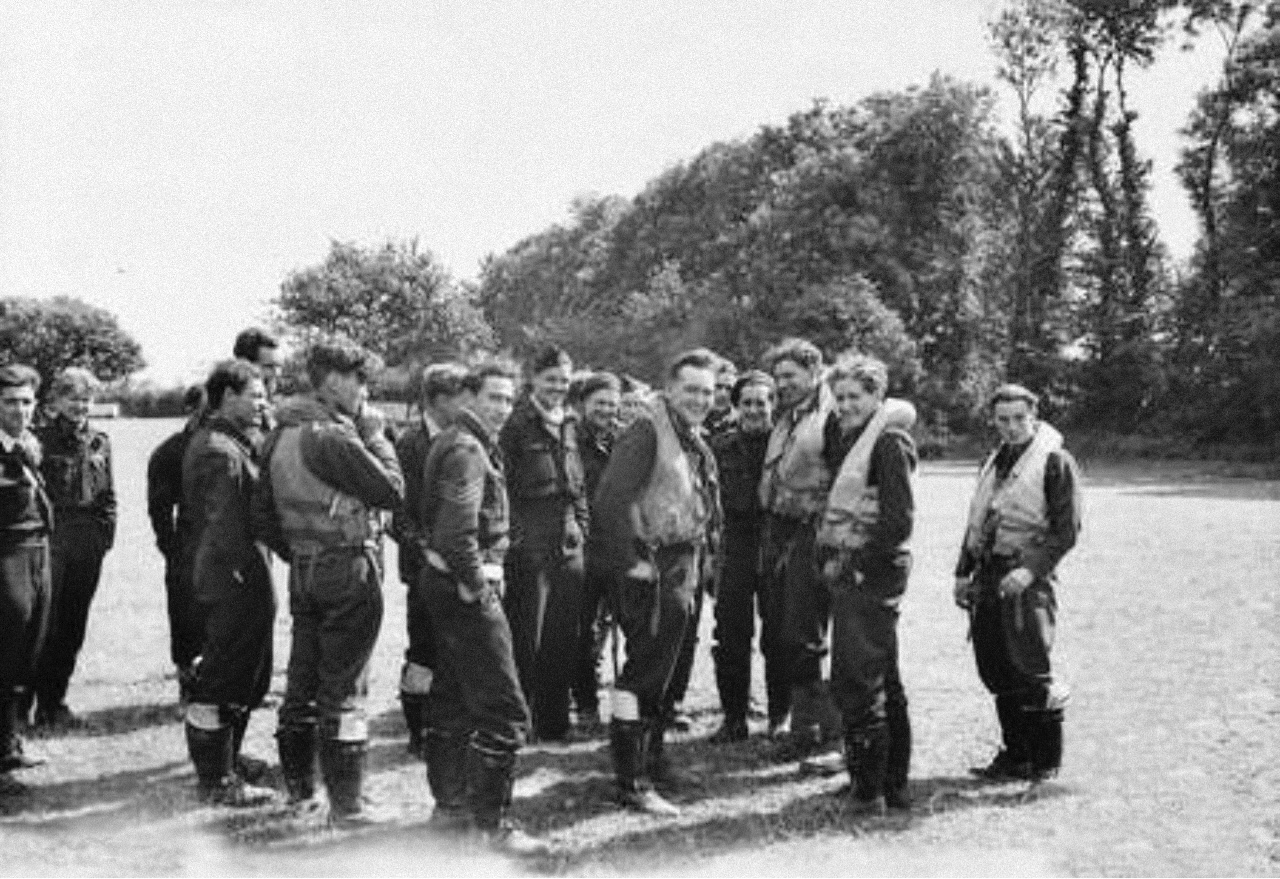
Australian and British pilots of No. 453 Squadron RAAF in Normandy during July 1944

The Australian contribution to the Battle of Normandy involved more than 3,000 military personnel serving under British command. The majority of these personnel were members of the Royal Australian Air Force (RAAF), though smaller numbers of Australians serving with the Royal Navy and British Army also participated in the fighting prior to and after the Allied landings on 6 June 1944. While all the RAAF units based in the United Kingdom (UK) took part in the battle, Australians made up only a small portion of the Allied force.

The Australians who supported the D-Day invasion included between 2,000 and 2,500 RAAF airmen in Australian squadrons and British Royal Air Force units, and approximately 500 members of the Royal Australian Navy serving on Royal Navy vessels, as well as a small number of Australian Army officers and merchant seamen. The army personnel and thousands of Australian airmen also took part in the subsequent Battle of Normandy between June and August 1944, and an RAAF fighter squadron operated from airfields in Normandy. Throughout the campaign, Australian airmen provided direct support to the Allied ground forces by attacking German military units and their supply lines, as well as forming part of the force that defended the beachhead from air attack and manning transport aircraft. Australians also indirectly supported the campaign by attacking German submarines and ships that threatened the invasion force. The 13 Australian Army officers who took part in the campaign filled a variety of roles in British units in order to gain experience that they could take back to Australia.

Australian personnel also took part in the invasion of Southern France in August 1944, and RAAF airmen continued to operate against German forces until the end of the war in May 1945. However, the relatively low casualties suffered by the Allied air forces during the fighting in Normandy and subsequent campaigns resulted in an over-supply of trained Australian aircrew in the UK, hundreds of whom were never assigned to a combat role. Australia's contribution to the fighting in Normandy is commemorated in memorials and cemeteries in London and Normandy.

== Background ==
In 1944 Australia's war effort was focused on the Pacific War, and most elements of the country's military were in Australia and the islands to its north. Nevertheless, substantial numbers of RAAF personnel, most of whom had been trained through the Empire Air Training Scheme (EATS), were stationed in the United Kingdom (UK) and took part in operations against Germany. The Australian Government had very little influence over where Australian graduates of EATS were posted, and many were assigned directly to British units. As of 6 June 1944, 1,816 Australian airmen (including 584 pilots) were posted to RAF squadrons. Many of the thousands of Australian ground crew in the UK at this time were also serving with RAF units. In addition, ten RAAF flying squadrons were stationed in the UK. These included one regular RAAF unit, No. 10 Squadron, and nine temporary Article XV squadrons, which had been formed under the agreement that underpinned EATS. While the Article XV squadrons were nominally Australian, most included a substantial proportion of personnel from Britain and other Commonwealth countries; as of 1 June 1944 they were manned by 796 Australian aircrew and 572 airmen from other countries. (Note: As of 1 June 1944, Australians comprised the following proportions of the total aircrew strength of each of the RAAF squadrons stationed in the UK: No. 10 Squadron: 93.1 per cent, No. 453 Squadron: 100 per cent, No. 455 Squadron: 60.5 per cent, No. 456 Squadron: 68.6 per cent, No. 460 Squadron: 48.2 per cent, No. 461 Squadron: 72.8 per cent, No. 463 Squadron: 56 per cent, No. 464 Squadron: 34.3 per cent; No. 466 Squadron: 66.8 per cent, No. 467 Squadron: 51.5 per cent.) Owing to an over-supply of aircrew trained through the Empire Air Training Scheme, there were also hundreds of RAAF airmen in the UK who were assigned to personnel depots while they waited to be posted to a combat unit; prior to the invasion these unattached airmen were considered an asset by the Allied air forces as they could rapidly replace casualties.

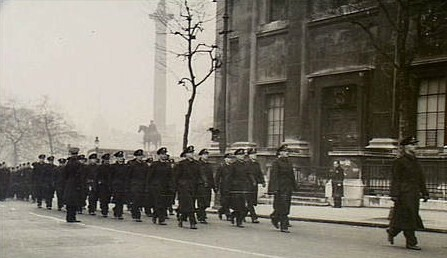
Australian airmen march through Trafalgar Square in London on 26 January 1944 en route to a church service to commemorate Australia Day.

The Australian air units were under the command of the RAF, which had 306 squadrons located in the UK at the time of the landings in Normandy. Two RAAF squadrons were assigned to the Second Tactical Air Force (2TAF), which was to provide direct support to the Allied armies during the campaign; No. 453 Squadron operated Spitfire fighters as part of No. 125 Wing and No. 464 Squadron flew Mosquito light bombers as part of No. 140 Wing. Four Australian heavy bomber squadrons formed part of RAF Bomber Command; No. 460, No. 463 and No. 467 Squadrons were equipped with Lancasters and No. 466 Squadron flew Halifaxes. No. 456 Squadron, which was a specialist night fighter unit equipped with Mosquitos, formed part of Air Defence of Great Britain and was assigned to protect the invasion force. Three other RAAF squadrons in the UK would also support operations in Normandy as part of Coastal Command; No. 10 and No. 461 Squadrons were equipped with Sunderland flying boats and flew patrols of the waters around the UK and France, while No. 455 Squadron operated against German surface shipping using Beaufighter strike aircraft.

In addition to the RAAF airmen operating as part of the RAF in the UK, hundreds of Royal Australian Navy (RAN) personnel were serving with the Royal Navy (RN) at the time of the Battle of Normandy. No Australian warships took part in the operation, however. Most of the Australian officers serving with the RN were members of the Royal Australian Naval Volunteer Reserve (RANVR). Four RAN sub-lieutenants who had been sent to the UK to undergo training were also assigned to RN landing craft units to help address a shortage of officers capable of coordinating operations by these vessels.

Thirteen Australian Army officers were attached to the British Army units that fought in Normandy. These officers had been posted to the UK to gain experience in planning and conducting large-scale amphibious operations, which would improve the army's procedures ahead of Australian landings in the Pacific. A single officer represented each of the Army's corps, and the personnel sent to the UK included some of the most talented and experienced members of the service.

== Pre-invasion preparations ==
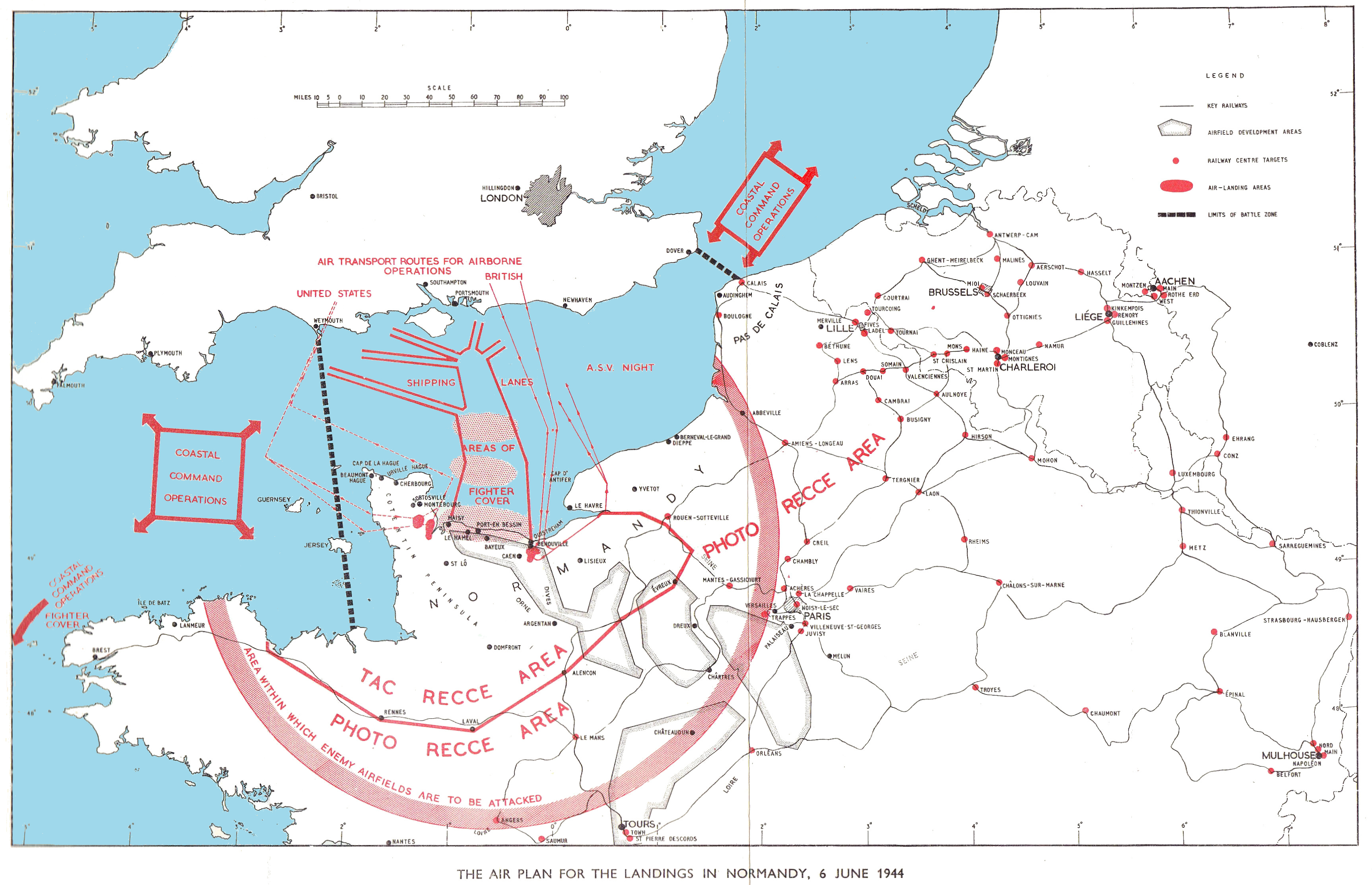
Map of the air plan for the Allied landing in Normandy

Few Australians were involved in planning the invasion. Some of those who had planning responsibilities included Lieutenant Colonel Ronald McNicoll, who served on the Operations Staff of the Supreme Headquarters Allied Expeditionary Force; Air Commodore Frank Bladin, Senior Air Staff Officer for No. 38 Group RAF; Lieutenant Commander Victor Smith, Flag Officer for British Assault Area's air planning officer; and Major Douglas Vincent, a signals officer attached to the headquarters of the British XXX Corps. Australian-born Air Commodore Edgar McCloughry, who had served with the RAF since 1919, headed the Allied Expeditionary Air Force Bombing Committee, which prepared air plans for the invasion.

During April and May the Allied air forces struck at German airfields as well as aircraft factories and repair facilities in France. No. 463 and No. 467 Squadrons participated in raids on airfields and factories near Toulouse on the nights of 5/6 April and 1/2 May, and bombed an airfield near Lanvéoc on the night of 8/9 May. The first of these raids involved 148 aircraft and was led by No. 467 Squadron's commanding officer, Wing Commander John Balmer. 2TAF also conducted 12 raids on German airfields during this period, of which eight involved individual Australians posted to RAF light bomber squadrons. Australians serving in the fighter squadrons of No. 10 Group RAF also occasionally took part in "ranger" operations over northern France in search of German aircraft. In addition, the 31 Australian pilots posted to RAF photo reconnaissance units frequently conducted sorties to monitor German dispositions along the coast of the English Channel. On 29 May Squadron Leader Douglas Sampson, who was posted to No. 16 Squadron RAF, took detailed photographs of Utah Beach which enabled the American force which was to land there to locate most of the German positions in the area.

The Allies also conducted a major air offensive against the French railway network and bridges over the river Seine from April to June. Bomber Command made 53 raids against these targets, of which 25 involved the four Australian heavy bomber squadrons. A total of 17 Australian bombers were lost during these operations, including six that German fighters shot down during an attack on the marshalling yards at Lille on the night of 10/11 May. In addition, Australians took part in 29 of the 46 raids conducted by 2TAF's light bombers against French railway infrastructure. Australian fighter pilots, including all of No. 453 Squadron on occasion, escorted some of these raids and conducted ground attack sorties targeting railway rolling stock. 2TAF's fighter-bombers also attacked bridges over the river Seine from April as part of an effort to seal off the Normandy region, and Australian pilots posted to British squadrons were involved in a small number of these operations. No. 453 Squadron attacked bridges and viaducts near Normandy on 27 April and 2 May.

Australians participated in attacks on German defences in France in the weeks before D-Day. No. 453 Squadron made four raids on radar stations in late May and early June, and RAAF pilots serving with British fighter and fighter-bomber squadrons took part in other such attacks. The four Australian heavy bomber squadrons contributed aircraft to raids on radar stations and communications facilities in the week before the landing. These units also struck German coastal batteries along the channel coast on nine occasions between 8 and 29 May; Australians serving with British light bomber units took part in a further 14 raids on German batteries. The RAAF heavy bomber squadrons and Australians in RAF light and heavy bomber units also participated in raids against German Army camps in France and Belgium during May. The Australian squadrons suffered heavy losses in several of these attacks, including seven aircraft lost during a raid on the 21st Panzer Division's facilities at Mailly-le-Camp on the night of 3/4 May. In addition to these attacks on German positions, Bomber Command struck the seven largest German munitions factories and ammunition dumps in France during late April and early May; the four Australian squadrons participated in five of these operations, and no Australian aircraft were lost.

Leading up to the invasion, the RAF intensified its operations against German submarines and ships operating near France. Coastal Command aircraft destroyed six submarines within eleven days during May; Australian aircrew contributed to three of these sinkings. Bomber Command also expanded its program of laying naval mines from April, and No. 460 Squadron as well as Australians posted to RAF light and heavy bomber units took part in several minelaying operations in the Baltic Sea and Heligoland Bight. Coastal Command's anti-shipping force, which included the RAAF's No. 455 Squadron, mainly undertook training exercises from April, but occasionally attacked German convoys in the English Channel.

Australian airmen were also involved in protecting southern England from German air attack in the lead-up to the invasion. From late April to early June No. 456 Squadron was part of a force that defended port cities in southern England from a series of air raids. The Australian squadron accounted for eight of the 22 bombers shot down by Air Defence of Great Britain night fighters during this period. No. 464 Squadron also conducted "intruder" raids that tried to destroy German bombers as they returned to their bases in France. During this period, No. 453 Squadron and 36 Australians posted to eight RAF units took part in defensive patrols which sought to prevent German reconnaissance aircraft flying over southern England during daylight hours, but no German aircraft attempted this.

In addition to the air campaign, a small number of Australians took part in special operations ahead of the invasion. In January 1944, RANVR officer Lieutenant Ken Hudspeth, who commanded the midget submarine HMS X20, transported a party of specialist personnel to inspect and collect soil samples from French beaches being considered for the invasion. This operation was successful, and earned Hudspeth his second Distinguished Service Cross (DSC). Nancy Wake, a New Zealand-born Australian serving with the British Special Operations Executive, was parachuted into France in April 1944 and subsequently helped to organise the French Resistance in the Auvergne region.

== Australians at D-Day ==
On the night of 5/6 June Bomber Command conducted precision attacks on ten German coastal artillery batteries near the beaches where Allied troops were to land. Each battery was targeted by approximately 100 heavy bombers, and all four Australian heavy bomber squadrons took part in the operation. No. 460 Squadron dispatched 26 aircraft, which were evenly split between attacking the batteries at Fontenay-Crisbecq and St Martin de Varreville. No. 466 Squadron provided 13 aircraft to the raid on batteries at Merville-Franceville Maisy, 14 aircraft from No. 463 Squadron struck Pointe du Hoe and No. 467 Squadron dispatched 14 against batteries at Ouistreham. The RAAF squadrons did not suffer any losses. Many Australian aircrew posted to British units also participated in this attack, and 14.8 per cent of the 1,136 Bomber Command aircraft despatched were either part of RAAF squadrons or were flown by Australians.

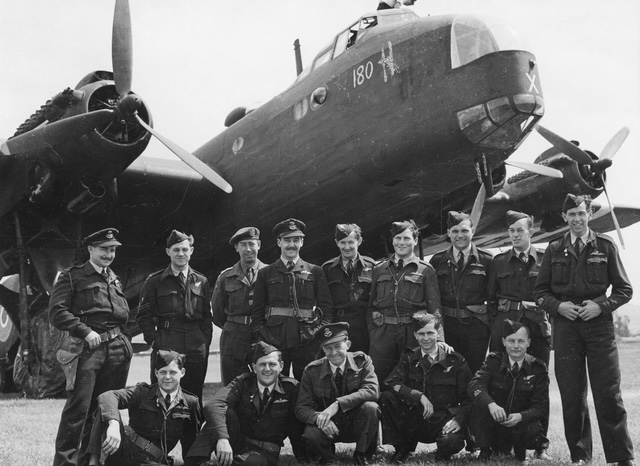
Australian members of No. 196 Squadron RAF with one of the unit's Stirling aircraft in the background. This squadron towed gliders to Normandy on D-Day.

Australians posted to RAF units also landed paratroopers in Normandy and took part in diversionary operations. On the night of 5/6 June several Australian airmen served in heavy bombers that dropped "window" chaff in patterns that, on German radar, simulated the appearance of convoys headed for the Pas de Calais region of France. Other Australians served in aircraft that dropped dummy paratroopers and jammed German radar. One Australian pilot posted to No. 139 Squadron RAF took part in "intruder" bombing raids against targets in western Germany and the Low Countries that sought to divert German aircraft away from Normandy. Australian aircrew also served aboard the transport aircraft of No. 38 Group RAF and No. 46 Group RAF, which flew the British 6th Airborne Division from the UK to Normandy on the night of 5/6 June. About 14 per cent of the transport aircraft in No. 38 Group were piloted by Australians, though the proportion of Australians in No. 46 Group was much lower. There were no completely Australian aircrews in either group.

Australian aircrew supported the fighting on 6 June. No. 453 Squadron was one of 36 Allied squadrons that provided low-altitude air defence for the invasion fleet and landing force. Many of the squadron's pilots flew several sorties during the day, though they did not encounter any German aircraft. No. 456 Squadron also formed part of the force that provided air defence for the invasion area at night. In addition, about 200 Australian pilots were spread across the dozens of RAF fighter and fighter-bomber units that supported the landings. A small number of Australian aircrew also served in RAF reconnaissance units and 2TAF's light bomber squadrons, which also saw combat over France on D-Day. The three Australian squadrons assigned to Coastal Command flew only a small number of sorties on 6 June as few German submarines or E-boats put to sea.

About 500 RAN personnel served on board RN ships involved in the operation. While most formed part of the crew of RN warships, at least twelve RANVR officers commanded ships or groups of minesweepers. (Note: Janet Roberts Billett has observed that due to a lack of accurate records it is not possible to determine how many RANVR personnel took part in the Normandy landings.) For instance, Sub-Lieutenant Dean Murray commanded a force of six RN Landing Craft Assault that landed soldiers of the British 3rd Infantry Division at Sword Beach. Hudspeth also took X20 across the channel to mark the edge of Juno Beach during the landings there; he received his third DSC for completing this mission. Some of the warships with Australian crew members that supported the landings were HMS Ajax (which had three RANVR officers on board), Ashanti, Enterprise, Eskimo, Glasgow, Mackay and Scylla. Australian members of the Merchant Navy also participated in the D-Day landings, though the number of sailors involved is not known.

Few of the Australian Army officers attached to British units landed on D-Day. Major Jo Gullett, who was the second in command of an infantry company in the 7th Battalion, Green Howards, came ashore on Gold Beach as part of the invasion force. In his memoirs, Gullett described the landing as "easily the most impressive occasion of my life". He subsequently led a company of the Royal Scots until he was wounded by German machine gun fire on 17 July. Most of the other Australian officers served in staff positions; for instance Lieutenant Colonel Bill Robertson was the chief of staff of the 51st (Highland) Infantry Division when that unit arrived in Normandy and was later posted to the 50th (Northumbrian) Infantry Division where he served in the same role. Vincent came ashore on 7 June and served with XXX Corps, 7th Armoured and 43rd (Wessex) Infantry Divisions during the campaign.

Due to the lack of a nominal roll or other records listing the Australians who took part in the D-Day landings, it is not possible to determine the exact number involved. However, it has been estimated that about 3,000 Australian military personnel and merchant seamen participated in the operation. (Note: Sharpe (2004), p. 36 estimates that "about 3,325" Australians took part in the Battle of Normandy and Stanley (2004) states that "the invasion force included up to about 3,000 Australians". Sharpe (2004), pp. 36–37 discusses the difficulty of determining the number of Australians involved in the operation, raising the issues of whether estimates should include support personnel who remained at bases in the UK, Australian citizens who enlisted directly in the British military or veterans of the Normandy fighting who migrated to Australia after the war.) Historians also give slightly different figures for the number of Australians killed on 6 June. Peter Stanley wrote in 2004 that there were 14 Australian fatalities, of whom 12 were RAAF airmen and two members of the RAN, and in 2019 Lachlan Grant put the number killed at 13.

== Subsequent fighting ==
The fighting in Normandy continued until August 1944, when the Allies broke out of the region and rapidly advanced to the German border. This campaign dominated the activities of eight of the ten Australian squadrons in the UK, as well as most of the airmen posted to RAF units. During July and August the RAAF units operated at or near their highest level of activity in the war to that point, but morale remained high as the airmen perceived that the contribution of air power to the campaign would be decisive. Large numbers of Australian airmen who were undergoing training or awaiting a posting on D-Day were assigned to combat units during the fighting to replace casualties of the Normandy campaign. (Note: Grant (2014) states that this movement of Australian airmen "increases the total participation [in the Normandy campaign] markedly from the figure for the operation on D-Day itself".)

Many members of the RANVR who were serving with the Royal Navy participated in the Battle of Normandy during the months after the landings. This included forming part of the crew of ships that transported personnel and supplies to Normandy.

A small number of Australian served in Normandy with the British Army. These included a truck driver who served with the Mechanised Transport Corps, two Australians in Queen Alexandra's Imperial Military Nursing Service and a member of the Territorial Army Nursing Service.

In addition to the military personnel involved in the fighting, several Australian war correspondents reported on the Battle of Normandy. Chester Wilmot landed with the 6th Airborne Division on D-Day, and his coverage of the fighting for the BBC soon made him one of the best-known Allied war correspondents. Other Australian journalists in Normandy included John Hetherington, Geoff Hutton, Anne Matheson and Ronald Monson.

=== June ===
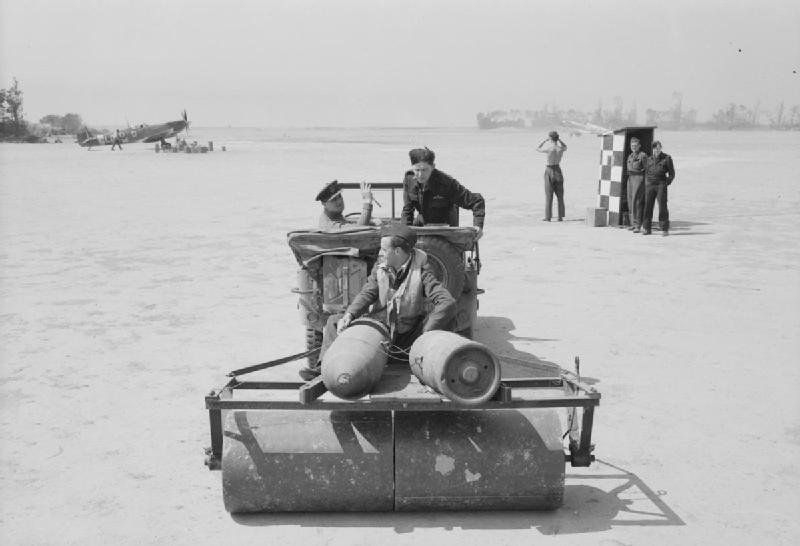
Three members of No. 453 Squadron RAAF help flatten the ground at Advanced Landing Ground B11, Longues-sur-Mer (June to September 1944). They use a locally acquired agricultural roller weighed down with two 500lb bombs.

Australian airmen were involved in Allied efforts to delay German reinforcements from reaching Normandy throughout June. On the night of 6/7 June, 20 Mosquitos from No. 464 Squadron were dispatched to attack German road convoys and trains in northern France. The four Australian heavy bomber squadrons also participated in raids on French towns on this night. While No. 463, No. 466 and No. 467 Squadrons mainly targeted railway facilities, No. 460 Squadron formed part of an attack on Vire, which sought to destroy the town to prevent the Germans from using the roads through it. Following these initial raids, Bomber Command continued to target railway infrastructure in France in an attempt to disrupt the movement of German reinforcements to Normandy. The command operated intensively during the week after the invasion, and some Australian aircrew flew raids on consecutive nights during this period. Overall, Bomber Command made 16 raids against railway facilities in France between 13 and 30 June, of which six included at least one of the RAAF squadrons. The RAAF heavy bomber squadrons and Australians in RAF units also took part in several attacks on German supply dumps and airfields during this period. Bomber Command made fewer raids on these targets than had been planned prior to the invasion, however, as its units were frequently assigned to strike facilities associated with the V-1 flying bombs the Germans were launching against the UK. No. 464 Squadron also operated against German vehicles travelling at night and bombed railway yards, and flew 75 sorties between the nights of 7/8 and 12/13 June. Overall, the squadron conducted attacks on 19 nights during June, during which five of its aircraft were destroyed. The Australians in 2TAF's other light and medium bomber units also attacked the German lines of communication in France and occasionally provided direct support for the Allied ground forces throughout this period.

During June, Australians also contributed to the defence of the Allied beachhead against German air and naval attacks. No. 453 Squadron and the RAAF fighter pilots in RAF units continued to fly patrols over the beachhead in the week after D-Day, but only rarely encountered German aircraft. From 11 June the Australian squadron's aircraft frequently operated from airfields built at Normandy, and on the 25th of the month it and the other units of No. 125 Wing moved from the UK to Advanced Landing Ground B11 within the beachhead near Longues-sur-Mer. By late June, No. 453 Squadron and the other RAF Spitfire units were regularly attacking German positions in Normandy as well as providing air defence for the Allied forces in the area; during the month the squadron flew more than 700 sorties. A small number of Australians posted to RAF squadrons equipped with Hawker Typhoon fighter-bombers also attacked German vehicles and positions in direct support of the Allied ground troops throughout the month. No. 456 Squadron, which was one of four night fighter squadrons assigned to protect the beachhead, frequently met German aircraft and shot down twelve of them in the week after the landing. Australian fighter ace Flight Lieutenant Nicky Barr, who had escaped from German custody in Italy during 1943, also briefly served in an air support control unit in Normandy. Barr landed at Omaha Beach on 9 June, but returned to the UK three days later as his commanding officer believed that German forces would execute Barr if they recaptured him.

German submarines and surface warships sortied to attack the Allied invasion fleet, and the Australian members of Coastal Command participated in attacks on these vessels. The two RAAF flying boat squadrons operated intensively throughout June, but did not sink any German ships or submarines. The aircrew of two of the British B-24 Liberators that sank German submarines during this period included Australian personnel, however, and Australians were on board several of the other RAF aircraft flying anti-submarine and anti-shipping patrols. In addition, No. 455 Squadron took part in several attacks on E-boats operating near Normandy as well as German shipping travelling through the English Channel. No. 460 Squadron and Australians in other Bomber Command units also participated in raids on E-Boat bases at Le Havre and Boulogne on the nights of 14/15 June and 15/16 June respectively.

=== July and August ===
By July the Allied armies were having difficulty advancing against the German forces in Normandy. In an attempt to create a breakthrough, the Allied air commanders decided to use heavy bombers to attack German positions. The first of these attacks was made on 7 July by 467 Bomber Command aircraft and targeted German forces near Caen, as well as the city itself. The Australian contribution to this raid included 20 Lancasters from No. 460 Squadron and 14 Halifaxes from No. 466 Squadron as well as aircrew in RAF units. One of No. 460 Squadron's aircraft made a crash landing within the Allied beachhead after being damaged by German anti-aircraft guns, but its crew survived and were evacuated to the UK. While the attack devastated Caen, the ground troops were only able to capture the northern half of the city when they advanced on 8 July. All four Australian heavy bomber squadrons participated in a series of attacks on German positions on 18 July as part of Operation Goodwood, but this offensive also failed to result in a breakthrough. On 30 July, No. 463, No. 466 and No. 467 Squadrons contributed aircraft to another major bombardment of German positions near Caumont ahead of Operation Bluecoat; 693 heavy bombers took part in this attack, of which 39 were from the Australian squadrons, but many did not drop their bombs as cloud obscured the aiming markers in the target area. All four Australian heavy bomber squadrons participated in the next major attack, which took place on the night of 7/8 August to support Operation Totalize, but cloud and smoke again prevented many of the bombers from attacking the target area. The four squadrons also attacked German Army positions on 14 August in support of Operation Tractable; visibility was clear over most of the target area, and the raids were considered successful. By this time the Allied armies had successfully broken out of Normandy, and no further heavy bomber attacks were required.

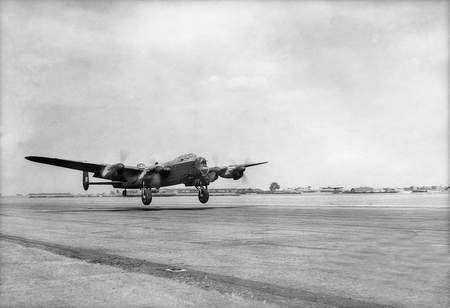
A No. 463 Squadron Lancaster taking off from RAF Waddington for a daylight raid in support of Allied forces in Normandy during August 1944

Australians also continued to be involved in Allied air attacks aimed at disrupting movement of German troops and supplies to Normandy during July and August. As well as supporting the ground forces in Normandy and continuing to bomb V-1 flying bomb launch facilities in northern France, Bomber Command attacked railway facilities in France during July and August, and at least one of the Australian heavy bomber squadrons participated in 15 of the 25 raids conducted against these targets. No. 464 Squadron also flew more than 350 sorties during July and 400 in August against transport infrastructure in France and convoys of German vehicles. These operations, which were generally conducted at night, cost the unit three aircraft. The only interruption to No. 464 Squadron's attacks on transportation came on the night of 14/15 July, when four aircraft piloted by highly experienced airmen conducted a successful precision strike on the Gestapo barracks at Bonneuil-Matours. Australian aircrew assigned to other 2TAF medium bomber and fighter-bomber units also participated in attacks on bridges and railways throughout July.

No. 453 Squadron operated from Normandy during July and August, and mainly patrolled behind the German front line in search of motor transport to attack. It occasionally encountered German aircraft during this period and shot down several Me 109 and Fw 190 fighters. The squadron flew 727 sorties during July, but lost several of its Spitfires to German anti-aircraft guns. No. 453 Squadron continued to operate against German transport during August, and moved to an airfield near Lingèvres on the 13th of the month. This airfield was attacked by a German aircraft the next day, resulting in the death of one Australian pilot and another three wounded. The squadron experienced considerable success during the Allied break-out, and claimed to have destroyed a large number of German vehicles during August. Overall, No. 453 Squadron flew more than 1,300 combat sorties during July and August. While No. 456 Squadron's night fighters conducted patrols over Normandy in early July and shot down four German bombers on the 5th of the month, the unit—in common with almost all the Mosquito-equipped night fighter squadrons stationed in the UK—was tasked with intercepting V-1 flying bombs from 6 July onwards.

The Australian flying boat squadrons assigned to Coastal Command also continued to support the invasion during July and August. On 8 July a No. 10 Squadron Sunderland sank the German submarine U-243 130 miles (210 km) south-west of Brest. Overall, No. 10 Squadron flew 56 patrols during July and No. 461 Squadron conducted 67, most of which were made at night. One of No. 461 Squadron's Sunderlands damaged the submarine U-385 150 miles (240 km) south of Brest on 10 August, and it was sunk the next day by HMS Starling. On 13 August another No. 461 Squadron Sunderland attacked and sank U-270. No. 10 Squadron flew almost as many patrols throughout August as it had during July, but did not encounter any submarines. No. 455 Squadron took part in attacks on German shipping travelling off the Netherlands and in the North Sea during July and August, but these operations were not directly related to supporting the invasion.

== Aftermath ==
RAAF personnel also participated in the Allied invasion of southern France (Operation Dragoon) during August 1944. No. 458 Squadron, which was equipped with Wellington bombers, flew anti-submarine patrols and attacked targets in northern Italy and southern France ahead of the landings, which took place on the 15th of the month. The squadron continued these duties until the end of August. The Spitfire-equipped No. 451 Squadron escorted Allied invasion convoys on 14 August and patrolled over the Allied beachhead as troops came ashore the next day. From 25 August the squadron was based at an airfield near Cuers in France and provided air defence for the region until October. Few German aircraft were encountered throughout this period, however.

The low casualties the Commonwealth air forces incurred during the Battle of Normandy led to an over-supply of trained aircrew. While the number of pilots and other airmen undergoing training through the EATS had begun to be reduced in early 1944, by 30 June there were thousands of qualified airmen—including 3,000 Australians—in the UK waiting for posts in operational units. This number greatly exceeded the requirements of the Allied air forces. Accordingly, the flow of airmen from EATS training facilities in Canada to the UK was greatly cut back, and Australia ceased sending airmen overseas for training under the scheme in August. While 1,245 Australian airmen arrived in the UK during the last six months of 1944 (a reduction from the 5,181 who had arrived in the first six months of the year), only those who were qualified as air gunners were typically ever assigned to combat units. It was not possible to find flying positions for most of the remaining unattached airmen who arrived after June 1944, and some were posted back to Australia; the remainder spent the rest of the war in training courses and various non-flying roles.

Australian military personnel in Europe remained in action until the end of the war. At the time of the German surrender in May 1945, there were 15,500 members of the RAAF in the UK and western Europe, of whom 12,300 were qualified aircrew. Most members of the small party of Australian Army officers who had been posted to the UK ahead of D-Day also remained in Europe until the end of the war.

== Commemoration ==
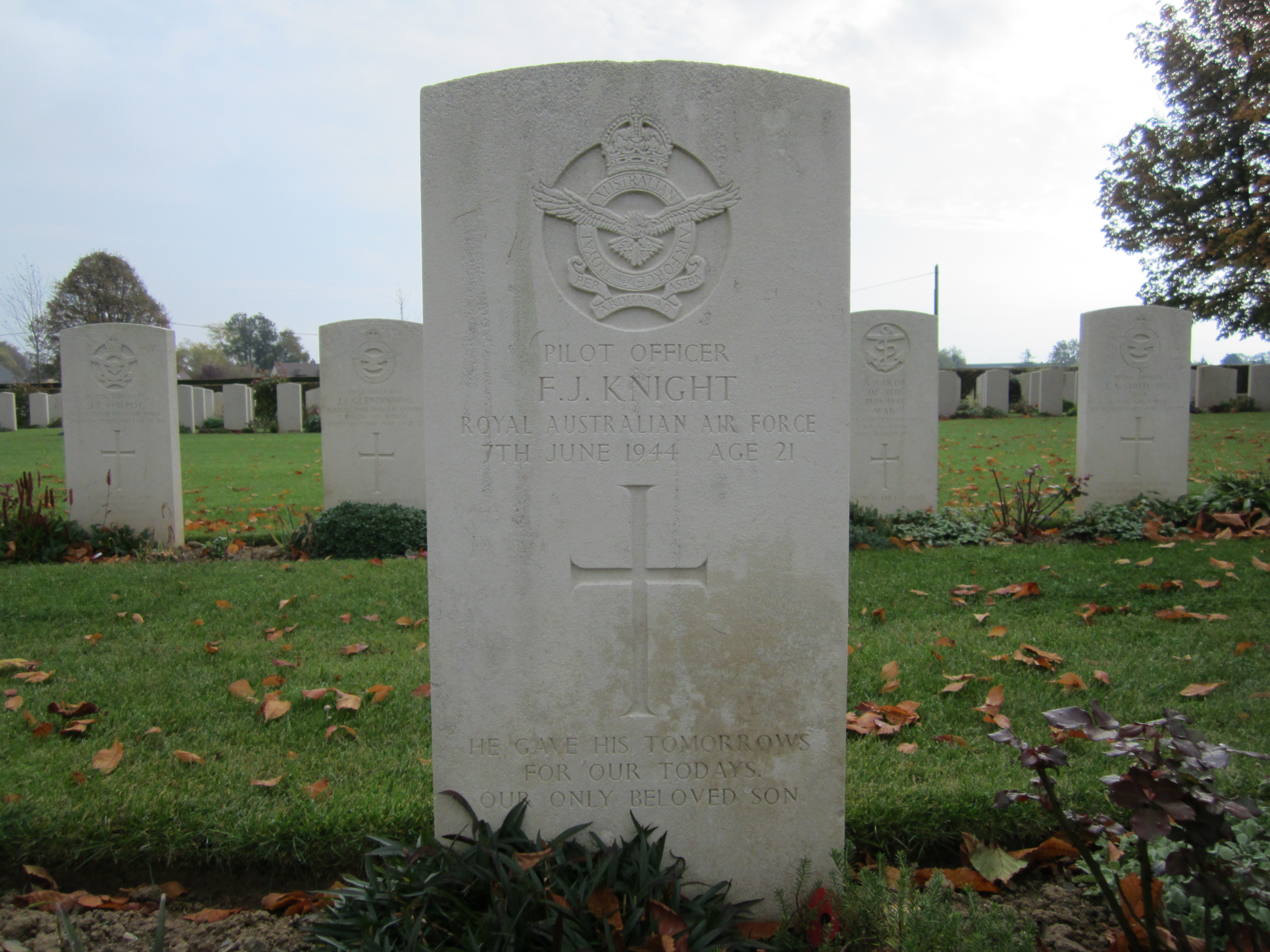
The grave of Pilot Officer Frederick James Knight at the Bayeux War Cemetery. Knight was a pilot in No. 460 Squadron and the only Australian member of his Lancaster bomber's aircrew. All seven airmen were killed on 7 June 1944 when the bomber was shot down or crashed during a raid on Vire.

Overall, 1,177 Australian military personnel were killed in western Europe and Britain during the lead-up to the invasion of France and the subsequent Normandy Campaign. These losses were higher than those suffered by Australian forces in the Pacific during this period. The Australian War Memorial has stated that hundreds of Australian airmen were killed while supporting the Allied troops in Normandy, and that "in terms of total casualties June 1944 was the worst month in the history of the Royal Australian Air Force".

A total of 44 Australians are buried in Commonwealth War Graves Commission cemeteries in the Normandy region. These include men killed in the region prior to the invasion and those who died during the fighting in 1944. Of the Australian graves, 17 are located at the Bayeux War Cemetery, six at Saint-Désir de Lisieux, five at Banneville-la-Campagne, four at the Bretteville-sur-Laize Canadian War Cemetery, three at both Douvres la Délivrande and Hermanville-sur-Mer, two in Ranville and one each at Ryes-Nazenville, Saint-Manvieu-Norrey, Bolbec and Tilly-sur-Seulles. The Bayeux Memorial, which lists the names of Commonwealth personnel killed in Normandy with no known grave, does not include any Australians. The most recent burial of an Australian serviceman in Normandy took place in April 2011 when No. 453 Squadron pilot Flight Lieutenant Henry Lacy Smith was interred at Ranville War Cemetery. Smith drowned when his Spitfire crash-landed in the River Orne on 11 June 1944, but his body was not recovered until November 2010.

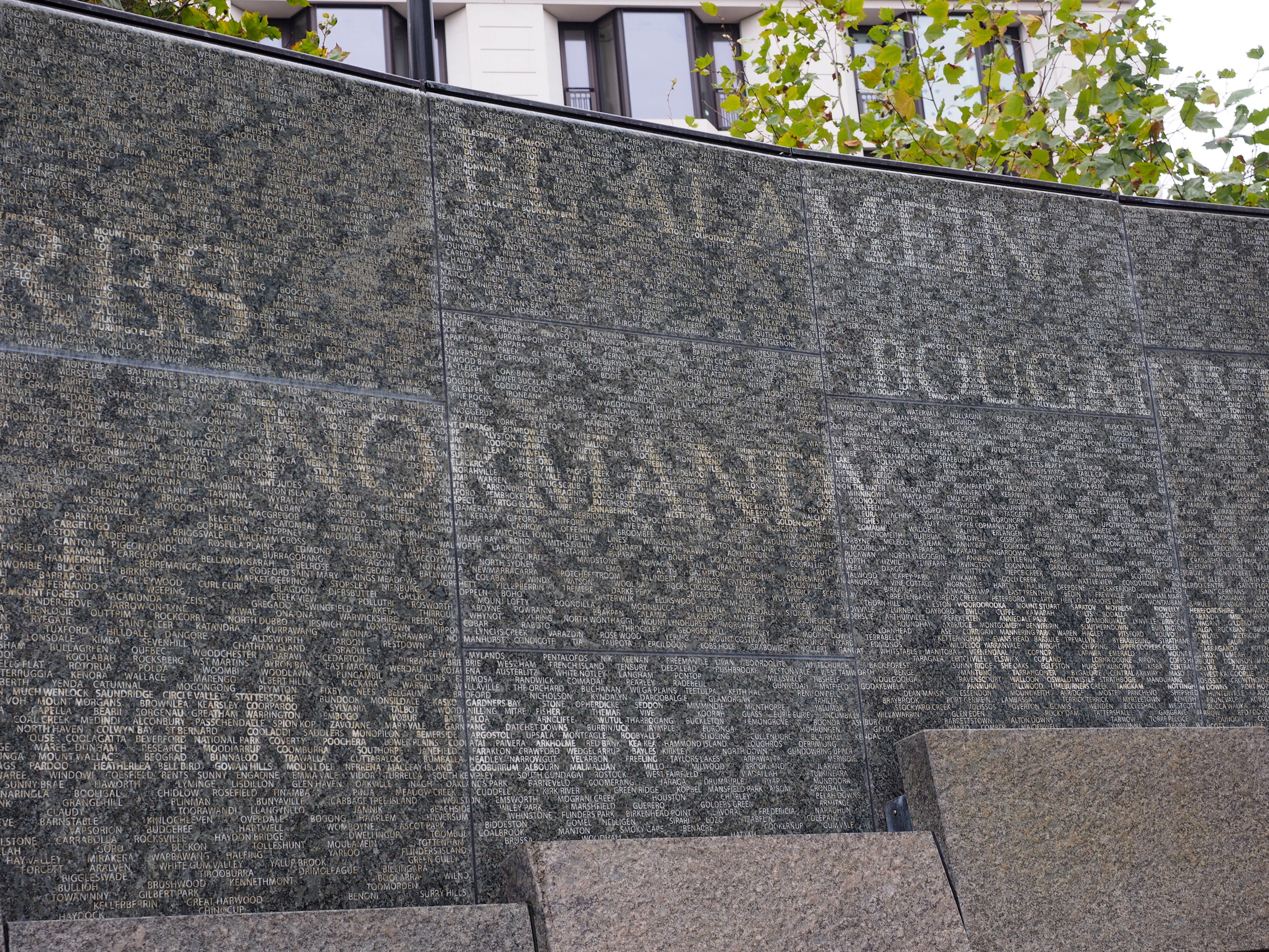
Normandy and some of the other World War II battles involving Australia inscribed on the Australian War Memorial in London

Australia's involvement in the Battle of Normandy has also been commemorated through memorials and official state visits. Many of the RAAF squadrons that fought in the campaign were awarded battle honours after the war in recognition of their contribution. "Normandy" is also one of the 47 battle sites recorded on the Australian War Memorial, London, which was dedicated in 2003. In 2004, Australian Prime Minister John Howard attended the ceremonies in France that marked the 60th anniversary of the Normandy invasion. The French Government also awarded the Legion of Honour to ten of the surviving Australian veterans of the landings to commemorate this anniversary. In 2014, Prime Minister Tony Abbott and a party of seven Australian veterans of the campaign attended ceremonies held to commemorate the 70th anniversary of D-Day. Prime Minister Scott Morrison attended the commemorations of the 75th anniversary of D-Day in 2019. Governor-General David Hurley represented Australia at the 80th anniversary commemorations in 2024. When the Mémorial de Caen opened in 1988, the flagpoles outside the museum commemorating the countries that participated in the battle did not include an Australian flag. Former No. 453 Squadron fighter pilot Colin Leith campaigned to have an Australian flag added, and this was achieved on 1 May 1998.

Despite these commemorations, there is little awareness among modern Australians of their country's role in the fighting in Normandy. The campaigns fought in the Pacific have a much more prominent place in the public memory of World War II. Lachlan Grant, a historian at the Australian War Memorial, noted in 2024 that "traditionally there has been a sense that it [the Normandy landings] wasn’t much of an Australian story ... but there is a large Australian story there – we just needed to find out who the people were".

== See also ==
- Second Australian Imperial Force in the United Kingdom
