= No. 467 Squadron RAAF =

Royal Australian Air Force squadron

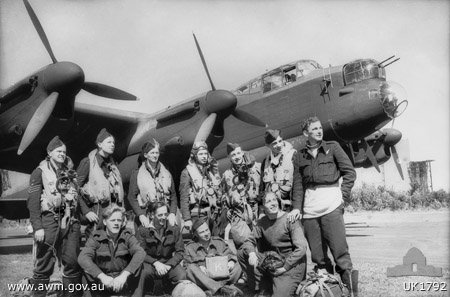
- Aircrew and ground staff from No. 467 Squadron RAAF with one of the squadron's Lancaster bombers in August 1944. The Lancaster is K-Kitty. Standing second from the right is navigator, Robert Sillett from Australia.
- Active: 7 November 1942 – 30 September 1945
- Country: Australia
- Allegiance: United Kingdom
- Branch: Royal Australian Air Force
- Role: Bomber squadron
- Part of: No. 5 Group RAF, Bomber Command
- Mottos: Recidite Adversarius Atque Ferociter (Loosely translated as: "Your opponents will retreat because of your courageous attack")
- Battle honours: Fortress Europe, 1940–1944; France and Germany, 1944–1945; Ruhr, 1940–1945; Berlin, 1940–1945; German Ports, 1940–1945; Normandy, 1944; Walcheren; Rhine

Commanders
- Notable commanders: John Balmer (1943–1944); William Brill (1944)

Insignia
- Squadron badge: A Kookaburra with a snake in its beak (unofficial)
- Squadron code: PO (1942–1945)

Aircraft flown
- Bomber: Avro Lancaster

No. 467 Squadron RAAF was a Royal Australian Air Force bomber squadron, active over North West Europe during World War II. Formed in November 1942 as an Article XV Squadron in Britain, the squadron was notionally an Australian squadron under the command of the Royal Air Force, and consisted of a mixture of personnel from various Commonwealth nations. After becoming operational in early 1943, the squadron flew operations in Occupied Europe until the end of the war flying Avro Lancaster heavy bombers. It was scheduled to deploy to the Far East to take part in further operations against Japan, but the war ended before it could complete its training and the squadron was disbanded in September 1945.

== History ==
No. 467 Squadron was formed at RAF Scampton, Lincolnshire, in the United Kingdom, under the Empire Air Training Scheme (EATS) on 7 November 1942 and was equipped with Avro Lancaster heavy bombers. Under the terms of the EATS, the squadron was nominally a Royal Australian Air Force unit, but it was manned by a mixture of Commonwealth personnel, the majority being British originally, although as the war progressed more Australians were posted in. Soon after becoming operational the squadron moved to RAF Bottesford, Leicestershire; it remained for a year before moving back to Lincolnshire, at RAF Waddington.

The squadron formed part of No. 5 Group, RAF Bomber Command, and flew its first operation on 2 January 1943, laying mines off the French coast near Furze. Five days later, it undertook a bombing raid on Essen in Germany. It suffered its first combat loss in April 1943 during a bombing raid on Thieuloy L'Abbaye, and after this it conducted raids on Germany, France, Norway, Czechoslovakia, and Italy from until 1945. According to the RAAF Museum, during these raids the squadron gained a reputation for accurate bombing and was selected to attack the two Glane culverts in the Dortmund-Ems Canal west of Ladbergen. Shipping along the canal between the North Sea and the Ruhr region was vital to the German war economy and heavily defended during several raids.

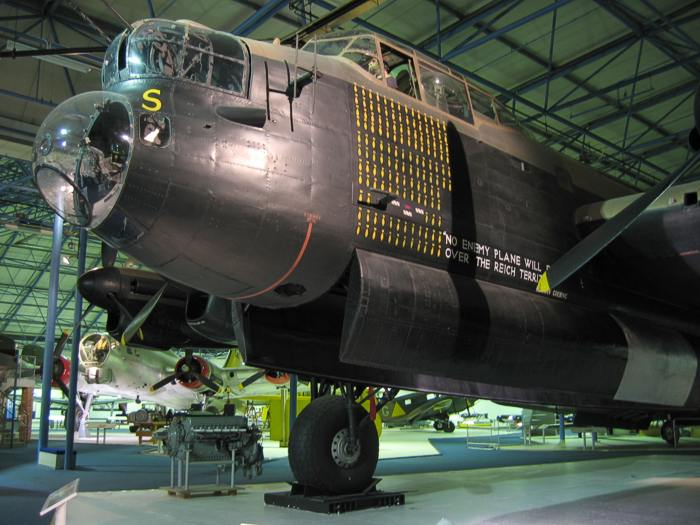
Avro Lancaster R5868 in the Bomber Hall of the RAF Museum London

The squadron was initially formed with three flights – designated 'A', 'B' and 'C' – although it was usual practice for Lancaster squadrons to consist of only two. In November 1943, No. 467 Squadron lost its third flight when it was used to raise No. 463 Squadron RAAF, another heavy bomber unit flying Lancasters.

The squadron took part in several notable actions including the bombings of the Ruhr, Berlin, and Hamburg. The squadron was also employed to attack targets around Peenemunde and other targets associated with the V1 and V2 rockets. It also supported the Normandy landings and the subsequent Allied breakout in 1944, and Operation Plunder, as the Allies crossed the Rhine and advanced into Germany the following year. To facilitate attacks deeper into Axis territory, in mid-1943 Bomber Command aircraft undertook several "shuttle service" raids, which involved aircraft departing England, attacking a target in Europe and then landing in North Africa where they would replenish before turning around and attacking another target and then return to England. No. 467 Squadron aircraft were the first to undertake such a raid, doing so on 20 June 1943, striking targets in Friedrichshafen on the first leg and then Spezia on the return.

The squadron's final operation before Germany capitulated came against an oil refinery at Vallo, in Norway, on the night of 25/26 April 1945. Following the end of the war in Europe, No. 467 Squadron's aircraft were used to transport liberated Allied prisoners of war to the United Kingdom. Later, in June, it moved to RAF Metheringham and was selected to form part of Tiger Force, which was being formed to operate against Japan from bases in Okinawa. At this time, the squadron began training to convert its aircrew from Lancasters to B-24 Liberators. The war ended before the squadron deployed to Asia and it was disbanded in the United Kingdom at Metheringham on 30 September 1945. During the war, the squadron flew a total of 3,833 sorties, during which it lost 118 aircraft. A total of 760 aircrew from 467 Squadron were killed, of which 284 were Australians.

No. 467 Squadron operated several famous Lancasters, amongst them LL843, survivor of 118 missions, and R5868, "S" for Sugar, which flew 137 operational sorties, a total that was exceeded by only one other RAF Bomber (Lancaster ED888). After the war this aircraft was selected to be preserved and could be seen for several years at the entrance of the squadron's first base, RAF Scampton. It now resides at the Royal Air Force Museum at the site of the former Royal Air Force station RAF Hendon, Colindale, London. The front section of the fuselage of another of the squadron's Lancasters, PO-F (DV372), is on display at the Imperial War Museum in London. PO-F (DV372) flew 49 missions.

== Aircraft operated ==
No. 467 Squadron operated the following aircraft:

From	To	Aircraft	Version
November 1942	June 1945	Avro Lancaster	Mks.I, III
June 1945	September 1945	B-24 Liberator	

== Squadron bases ==
No. 467 Squadron operated from the following bases:

From	To	Base
7 November 1942	24 November 1942	RAF Scampton, Lincolnshire
24 November 1942	12 November 1943	RAF Bottesford, Leicestershire
12 November 1943	16 June 1945	RAF Waddington, Lincolnshire
16 June 1945	30 September 1945	RAF Metheringham, Lincolnshire

== Commanding officers ==
No. 467 Squadron was commanded by the following officers:

From	To	Name
7 November 1942	15 August 1943 (KIA)	Wing Commander C.L. Gomm, DSO, DFC
16 August 1943	18 August 1943 (KIA)	Squadron Leader Alfred S. Raphael DFC
18 August 1943	11 May 1944 (KIA)	Wing Commander J.R. Balmer, OBE, DFC
12 May 1944	8 February 1945	Wing Commander W.L. Brill, DSO, DFC & Bar
8 February 1945	8 February 1945 (KIA)	Wing Commander J.K. Douglas, DFC, AFC
9 February 1945	4 March 1945 (KIA)	Wing Commander E. Le Page Langlois, DFC
4 March 1945	30 September 1945	Wing Commander I.A.H. Hay, DFC

== See also ==
- List of surviving Avro Lancasters
- Keith Thiele
