= John Balmer =

Royal Australian Air Force officer

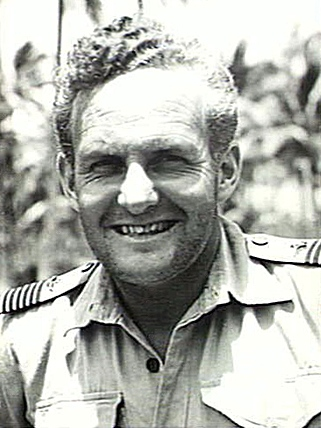
- Wing Commander John Balmer, September 1942
- Born: 3 July 1910; Bendigo, Victoria
- Died: 11 May 1944 (aged 33) near Herenthout, Belgium
- Military career
- Allegiance: Australia
- Branch: Royal Australian Air Force
- Service years: 1932–44
- Rank: Group Captain
- Nickname: "Sam"
- Unit: No. 1 Flying Training School (1935–37)
- Commands: No. 13 Squadron (1940–41); No. 7 Squadron (1942); No. 100 Squadron (1942–43); No. 467 Squadron (1943–44)
- Conflicts: World War II; South West Pacific theatre; New Guinea campaign; European theatre; Battle of Berlin
- Awards: Officer of the Order of the British Empire; Distinguished Flying Cross
- Other work: Cross-country motorist

John Raeburn Balmer, OBE, DFC (3 July 1910 – 11 May 1944) was a senior officer and bomber pilot in the Royal Australian Air Force (RAAF). Born in Bendigo, Victoria, he studied law before joining the RAAF as an air cadet in 1932. An instructor at Point Cook from 1935 to 1937, he achieved renown in Air Force circles when he reportedly parachuted from a training aircraft to motivate his pupil to land single-handedly. He also became known to the general public as a cross-country motorist, setting records for trans-Australia and round-Australia trips before World War II.

A flight lieutenant when war broke out, Balmer was promoted to squadron leader in June 1940, becoming the inaugural commanding officer of No. 13 Squadron, which operated Lockheed Hudsons out of Darwin, Northern Territory. He was raised to temporary wing commander in April 1941, and within a year had taken charge of the RAAF's first Bristol Beaufort unit, No. 100 Squadron. Appointed an Officer of the Order of the British Empire in June 1942, he led the Beauforts on bombing and torpedo missions against Japanese targets in the New Guinea campaign.

Posted to England in June 1943, Balmer took command of No. 467 Squadron RAAF, flying Avro Lancasters in the air war over Europe. He led his unit through the Battle of Berlin from November 1943 to March 1944. In April he was awarded the Distinguished Flying Cross, and the following month promoted to temporary group captain. Days later, on the night of 11/12 May, the last scheduled operation of his tour as No. 467 Squadron's commanding officer, Balmer failed to return from a mission over Belgium. Initially posted as missing, his plane was later confirmed to have been shot down, and all of the crew killed. Balmer was buried outside Brussels.

== Early life ==
The son of lawyer Sydney Balmer and his wife Catherine ("Kittie"), John Balmer was born in Bendigo, Victoria, on 3 July 1910. He attended Scotch College before studying law at the University of Melbourne, where he was a resident of Trinity College, and rowed in the Second Eight. In December 1932, he enlisted as an air cadet in the RAAF active reserve, known as the Citizen Air Force (CAF). Nicknamed "Sam", Balmer undertook flying instruction on the 1933 "B" (reservists) course conducted at RAAF Station Point Cook, Victoria, where his classmates included future group captain John Lerew. Balmer qualified as a pilot and was commissioned in April 1933. His first posting was to No. 1 Squadron, flying Westland Wapitis; he transferred from the CAF to the Permanent Air Force in November.

Promoted to flight lieutenant, from July 1935 to November 1937 Balmer was assigned to No. 1 Flying Training School, Point Cook, as an instructor. He gained a reputation as a hard taskmaster, and on one occasion—according to RAAF folklore—parachuted from a training aircraft to give his student the proper motivation to make a solo landing, though at least one newspaper at the time reported that he had in fact fallen out. On 15 August 1938, Balmer was forced to crash land an Avro Anson near Whitfield, Victoria, after its wings iced up—one of a series of accidents that befell the type following its introduction to Australian service. By mid-1939 he was instructing on Hawker Demon biplane fighters with No. 3 Squadron at RAAF Station Richmond, New South Wales.

Parallel to his Air Force career, in the years leading up to the outbreak of World War II Balmer gained national attention as a long-distance motorist. Partnered by a fellow officer, he set a cross-country record of 65 hours and 10 minutes travelling from Perth, Western Australia, to Melbourne in December 1936. He and another driver followed this up with a record-breaking round-Australia journey in October–November 1938, completing their run in 23½ days, almost halving the previous best time.

== World War II ==
=== South West Pacific ===
When Australia declared war in September 1939, Flight Lieutenant Balmer was a member of No. 22 Squadron, which conducted coastal surveillance out of Richmond with Ansons and, later, CAC Wirraways. Promoted to squadron leader, he was posted to RAAF Station Darwin, Northern Territory, on 1 June 1940, becoming the inaugural commander of No. 13 Squadron, which had been "cannibalised" from the base's resident unit, No. 12 Squadron. Retaining its Wirraway flight, No. 12 Squadron gave up its two flights of Ansons to the new formation; these were replaced later that month by more capable Lockheed Hudsons. From August 1940 until February 1941, No. 13 Squadron was responsible for patrolling the sea lanes off Australia's north coast. On occasion, Balmer detected Japanese luggers that were illegally fishing in Australian waters and, according to Mark Johnston, overflew them at such a low altitude that "his Hudson's slipstream rocked the boats violently" and the crew "shook their fists" at him. He was promoted to temporary wing commander in April. The following month, No. 13 Squadron conducted familiarisation flights over the Dutch East Indies. Balmer handed over command of the unit in August, and transferred to a liaison post at Headquarters RAAF Station Darwin.

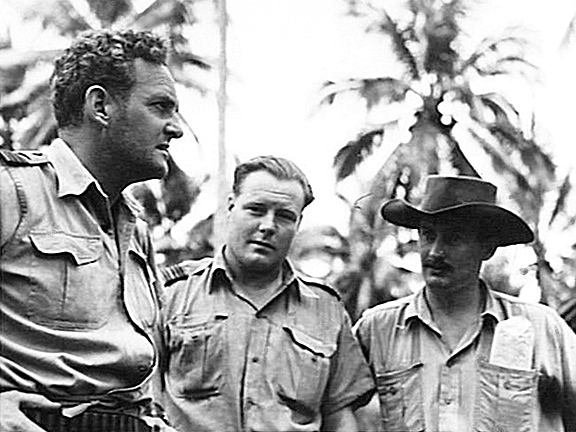
Wing Commander Balmer (left) as commanding officer of No. 100 Squadron, with Squadron Leaders "Bluey" Truscott (centre), commanding No. 76 Squadron, and Les Jackson (right), commanding No. 75 Squadron, at Milne Bay, 1942

In January 1942, Balmer briefly took charge of No. 7 Squadron, flying Hudsons on maritime patrol and convoy escort duties from RAAF Station Laverton, Victoria. Two months later he assumed command of the first RAAF unit to operate Australian-built Bristol Beauforts, No. 100 Squadron. It was formed at Richmond using the number of a Royal Air Force (RAF) squadron that had been decimated in the Malayan Campaign. In tribute to its original incarnation, Balmer adopted the RAF unit's crest, which featured a skull-and-crossbones emblem and the motto Sarang Tebuan Jangan Dijolok (Malay for "Do not stir up a hornet's nest"). No. 100 Squadron transferred to Mareeba in Far North Queensland on 22 May, after Balmer decided that a proposed base at Cairns was unsuitable owing to periodic flooding. While his crews at Mareeba gained experience on maritime patrols, he travelled to Port Moresby, New Guinea, on 26 May to test the Beaufort in operational conditions; as he came in to land he was fired upon by US anti-aircraft batteries, whose gunners had "never seen a Goddamn aircraft like that before", but escaped damage.

Balmer was appointed an Officer of the Order of the British Empire in the King's Birthday Honours on 11 June 1942. On 25 June he took five of No. 100 Squadron's Beauforts to Port Moresby, joining two other Beauforts that were already stationed there. That night he led five aircraft from his squadron on their first bombing mission, against a Japanese ship reported in the Huon Gulf near Lae. Despite finding his bomb release gear faulty, necessitating three low-level attack runs in the face of increasingly heavy anti-aircraft fire, Balmer managed to score two hits, and his companions also successfully bombed the vessel. The ship appeared to be on fire and sinking, and the squadron received credit for its destruction at the time, but later investigation could not confirm its loss. The unit withdrew to Laverton for training and patrol work during July and August, before moving to Milne Bay to again take part in the New Guinea campaign. On 7 September 1942, Balmer commanded a combined force of P-40 Kittyhawks from Nos. 75 and 76 Squadrons, Bristol Beaufighters from No. 30 Squadron, Hudsons from No. 6 Squadron, and his own No. 100 Squadron Beauforts in an assault on Japanese shipping near Milne Bay. It was the first time the Beauforts had been armed with torpedoes in combat, and they failed to score any hits.

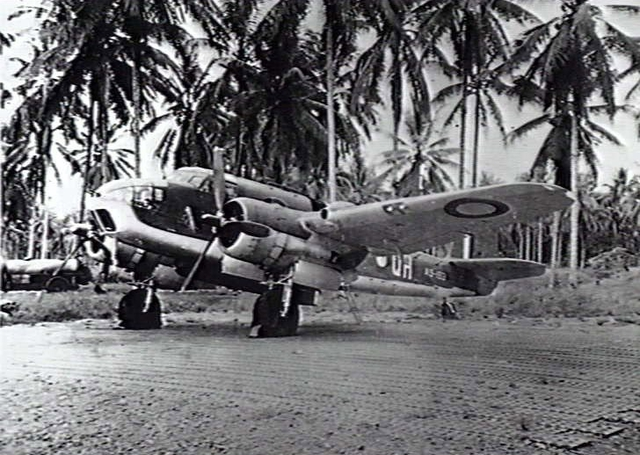
No. 100 Squadron Beaufort at Milne Bay, 1943

Beginning in October 1942, Nos. 6 and 100 Squadrons were given what the official history of the RAAF in World War II called the "huge task" of keeping open the sea lanes between Australia and New Guinea, while disrupting as best they could Japanese lines of communication and supply. The units kept up a punishing schedule of daily long-range reconnaissance and anti-submarine patrols, according to the official history, "practically without navigation aids, frequently through rain storms and heavy cloud" but, "supported by ground staffs as enduring as themselves, the crews maintained an almost inflexibly high standard and achieved considerable success". On the night of 4/5 October, Balmer took ten of his Beauforts from Milne Bay on a far-ranging assault against Japanese ships in the vicinity of the Shortland Islands, near Bougainville. Two aircraft disappeared along the way in storms and the remainder became separated into two flights that nevertheless managed to rendezvous near the target. Seven of these launched their torpedoes against as many ships and the crews believed that four were accurate, but were unable to confirm any hits because of dwindling visibility. The 950-nautical-mile (1,760 km) mission was considered a failure but this was put down to problems with the torpedoes and not the aircrew. Subsequent reports suggested that three ships had in fact been damaged.

Balmer came down with malaria in November 1942, and went on three weeks sick leave the following month; he returned to operations on 2 January 1943. In March, during the Battle of the Bismarck Sea, No. 100 Squadron launched its last torpedo attack; bad weather prevented all but two aircraft finding their targets, and no hits were registered. Towards the end of the month the unit dropped 17,000 pounds (7,700 kg) of bombs on Japanese installations in Salamaua.

=== Europe ===
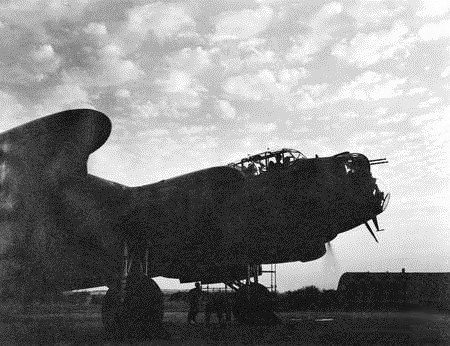
No. 467 Squadron Lancaster prior to departing RAF Waddington for a raid on Berlin, August 1943

Balmer relinquished command of No. 100 Squadron in April 1943, and was posted from the South West Pacific to the European theatre that June. His planned secondment to the RAF was for two years. Partly in an effort to bolster Australian aspirations to form a distinct RAAF group within RAF Bomber Command, in August he was appointed commanding officer of No. 467 Squadron, based at RAF Bottesford, Leicestershire. The squadron had been raised under Article XV of the Empire Air Training Scheme, and operated Avro Lancaster heavy bombers. Balmer led his unit in a costly raid on Nuremberg the night of 27/28 August, before attacking Hanover in September and October. From its new base at RAF Waddington, Lincolnshire, Balmer then took No. 467 Squadron through the Battle of Berlin that commenced in November 1943 and continued until March 1944. The statistical likelihood of surviving an operational tour of 30 missions in Bomber Command was never more than 50 per cent, and during the Battle of Berlin, loss rates were far higher. No. 467 Squadron was the only Australian unit to take part in all sixteen heavy attacks against the German capital during the battle. In the same period it also raided Frankfurt, Leipzig, Stettin, Stuttgart, Essen, and Augsburg.

Following the Battle of Berlin, No. 467 Squadron began to concentrate on targets in France and Belgium as the Allied air campaign shifted focus from strategic bombing to destroying airfields and disrupting lines of communication prior to the invasion of the continent. On the night of 10/11 April, Balmer led not only his own unit but a total of 148 aircraft of No. 5 Group RAF in an assault on Toulouse, striking at an airfield, and aircraft and explosives factories. The bombing was highly accurate, and the Australians suffered no losses on the raid.

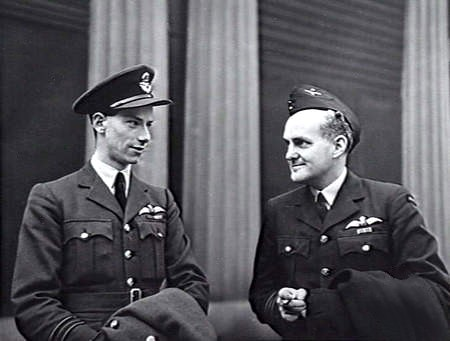
Balmer (right) as commanding officer of No. 467 Squadron, with another officer following an investiture ceremony at Buckingham Palace, November 1943

Considered a "dynamic" leader and a "brilliant" pilot, Balmer was decorated with the Distinguished Flying Cross (DFC) for "great skill and devotion to duty" during "a varied tour of operations"; promulgated in the London Gazette on 18 April, the award citation further described him as "a most efficient squadron commander, whose keenness and zeal have set a fine example". He also earned the respect of his crews with displays of empathy such as the occasion one of his young pilots, who had flown on 15 missions, refused to take off on his next sortie. Rather than take disciplinary action, Balmer allowed the man medical leave and sought out respite for him in the country, after which the pilot returned to active duty and completed his tour of operations. From early April, No. 467 Squadron began playing a leading role in a series of attacks against railways, which continued into the following month.

Balmer was promoted to temporary group captain on 4 May 1944. On 10/11 May, his Lancasters took part in a raid on Lille, losing three of their number. In an effort to shore up the morale of his younger crews, Balmer decided to personally lead their next mission the following night, against a military camp at Bourg-Léopold (Leopoldsburg), Belgium. It was planned to be his last operation before going on to a more senior position. His aircraft failed to return from the raid, causing considerable shock to his unit. The next day, Balmer's place as commanding officer of No. 467 Squadron was taken by Wing Commander William Brill, previously a member of No. 463 Squadron RAAF, which was also based at Waddington.

Initially posted as missing, Balmer and his crew were later confirmed to have died when their Lancaster crashed near Herenthout in provincial Antwerp after being attacked by a night fighter. Balmer was buried in Heverlee War Cemetery, outside Brussels. The Daily Mail reported that he had accumulated almost 5,000 flying hours, and compared his place in the RAAF to that of Leonard Cheshire's in the RAF. Aged 33, Balmer was unmarried at his death. His DFC was presented to his mother Kittie by the Governor-General of Australia shortly after the end of the war. Balmer's name appears at panel 110 of the Commemorative Area at the Australian War Memorial, Canberra.

== Notes ==
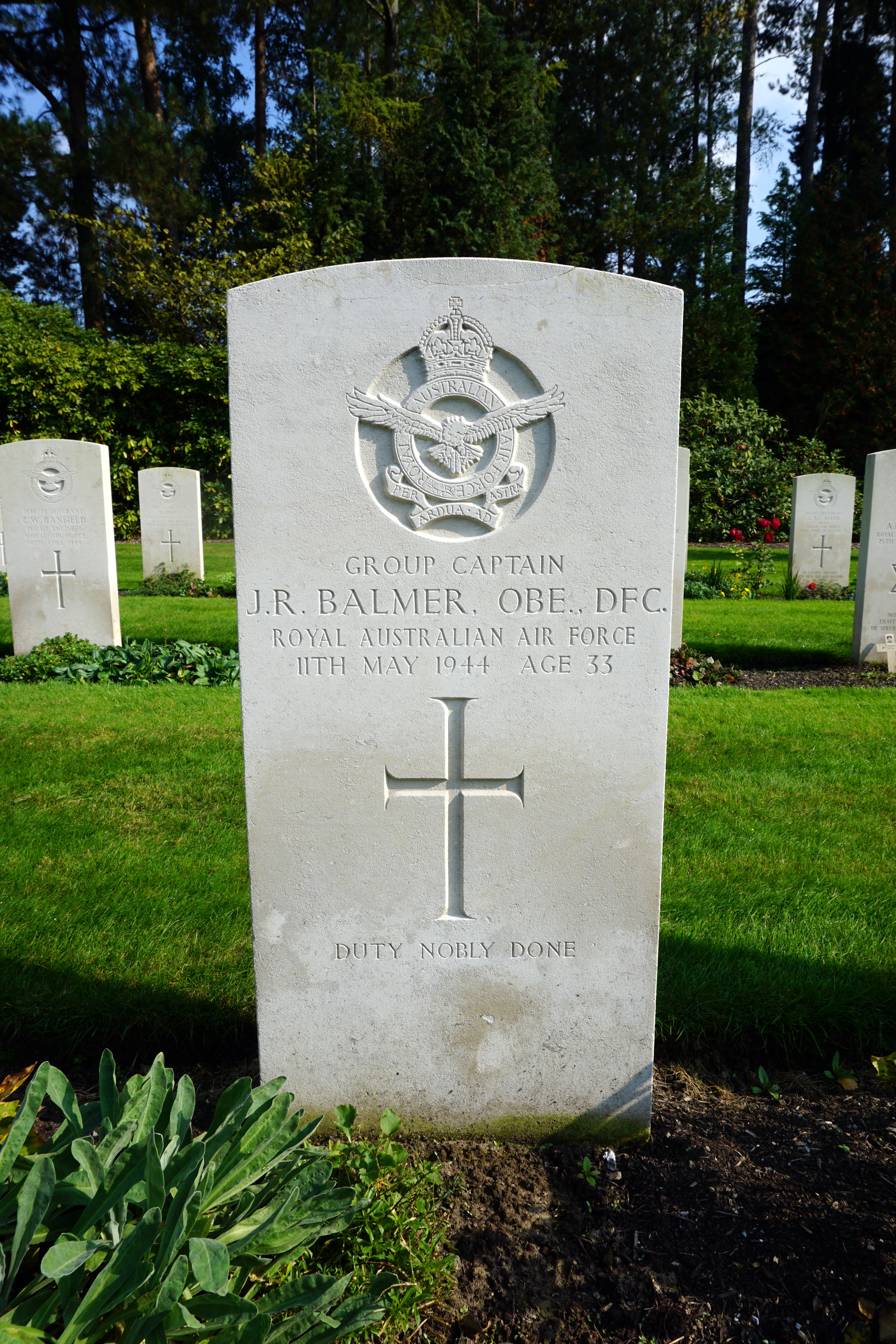
Grave at Heverlee War Cemetery
