= No. 7 Squadron RAAF =

Royal Australian Air Force squadron

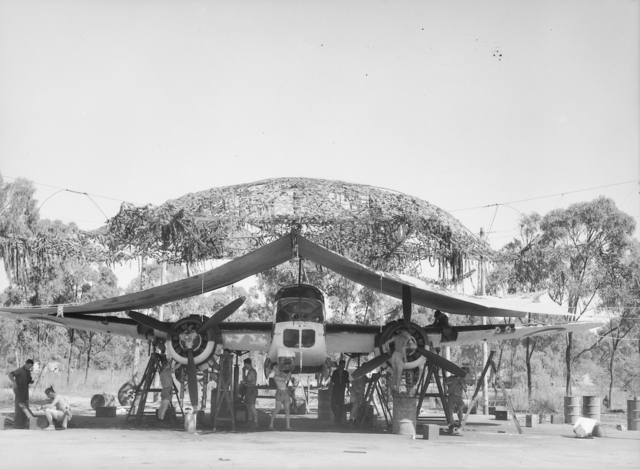
- A No. 7 Squadron Beaufort being serviced at Ross River
- Active: 1917–1919; 1940–1945
- Country: Australia
- Branch: Australian Flying Corps; Royal Australian Air Force
- Engagements: World War I World War II

Commanders
- Notable commanders: William Anderson (1918); John Balmer (1942)

No. 7 Squadron was an Australian flying training squadron of World War I and medium bomber squadron of World War II. The squadron was formed in England in October 1917 as part of the Australian Flying Corps, and disbanded in early 1919. It was re-formed by the Royal Australian Air Force on paper in June 1940, and operationally in January 1942. After seeing action during the Pacific War flying Lockheed Hudson and, later, DAP Beaufort bombers, the squadron was disbanded a second time in December 1945.

== History ==
No. 7 Squadron was established during World War I, being raised as a flying training squadron of the Australian Flying Corps (AFC) at Yatesbury, England, on 24 October 1917. Equipped with a wide range of aircraft, the squadron commenced training operations in February 1918 and was tasked to provide replacement aircrew to No. 3 Squadron until being disbanded in early 1919. Upon formation it was designated as No. 32 (Australian) (Training) Squadron, Royal Flying Corps, before adopting its AFC designation in early 1918. Its first commanding officer was Captain H.D.E. Ralfe.

During World War II, No. 7 Squadron was re-formed at RAAF Station Laverton, Victoria, on 27 June 1940. It was originally intended to equip the squadron with Lockheed Hudson aircraft, but the unit was reduced to cadre status. The squadron was re-formed in January 1942 as a Hudson operational training unit responsible for preparing aircrew for posting to other squadrons. Commanded by John Balmer, the squadron undertook several convoy escort flights and anti-submarine patrols along the Australian eastern seaboard. In early June, one of the squadron's aircraft located and attacked a Japanese submarine, possibly damaging it.

Shortly afterwards, the majority of the squadron was absorbed into No. 1 Operational Training Unit. In August 1942, what remained of the squadron moved to Nowra, New South Wales, where it was re-equipped with DAP Beaufort medium bombers and began training to operate in the bomber-reconnaissance role. The squadron completed its training in October and moved to Ross River near Townsville, Queensland, where it undertook convoy escort patrols over Australia's northern waters. During these operations, the squadron's aircraft damaged another Japanese submarine, shot down two Japanese Aichi E13A "Jake" seaplanes and damaged several others.

The squadron was based at Horn Island, Queensland, from April to October 1944, when it moved to Tadji, Papua New Guinea. From November 1944 until the end of the war, the squadron flew strike missions against Japanese positions in New Guinea in support of the Australian 6th Division. The squadron also participated in rescue operations for aircrew that came down behind Japanese lines. No. 7 Squadron was disbanded at Tadji on 19 December 1945. During the war, 33 personnel from the squadron were killed in action or died on active service.

== Aircraft operated ==
The squadron operated the following aircraft:

- Airco DH.6 (October 1917 – 1918);
- Royal Aircraft Factory R.E.8 (October 1917 – 1918);
- Royal Aircraft Factory B.E.2 (October 1917 – 1919);
- Avro 504 (February 1918 – 1919);
- Bristol Fighter (February 1918 – 1919);
- Lockheed Hudson (January 1940 – August 1942);
- DAP Beaufort (August 1942 – December 1945).
