= Metheringham Lass =

Coordinates: 53°08′15″N 00°20′47″W

The Metheringham Lass is the name given to an apparition which has been reported at RAF Metheringham.

Reports have stated that the woman, wearing a jacket bearing RAF insignia, approaches cars as they pass the old airfield, sometimes even physically interacting with the car. She begs the driver to help her boyfriend who has been injured in a motorcycle accident. However, when the driver exits the car to help, she vanishes. The apparition is said to be accompanied first by the smell of lavender, followed by the smell of decomposing flesh.

It has been speculated that the reported apparition is of Catherine Bystock, who died at the age of nineteen when her flight sergeant boyfriend crashed his motorcycle after a dance with them both on board. She died instantly.
