= RAF Metheringham =

Former RAF station in Lincolnshire, England

RAF Metheringham
- Metheringham, Lincolnshire in England
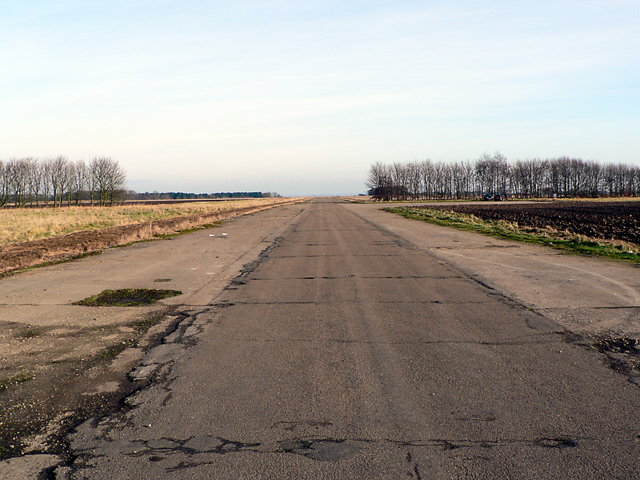
- The original southwest/northeast 4,200 ft (1,280 m) runway at RAF Metheringham photographed in 2006. Now in use as a minor access road across the fen.

Site information
- Type: Royal Air Force station
- Code: MN
- Owner: Air Ministry
- Operator: Royal Air Force
- Controlled by: RAF Bomber Command
- Website: www.metheringhamairfield.co.uk

Location
- Shown within Lincolnshire RAF Metheringham (the United Kingdom)
- Coordinates: 53°08′15″N 00°20′47″W

Site history
- Built: 1943
- In use: 1943 - 1946
- Battles/wars: European theatre of World War II

Airfield information
- Elevation: 63 feet (19 m) AMSL
Runways
Direction	Length and surface
02/20	6,000 feet (1,829 m) Tarmac
07/25	4,200 feet (1,280 m) Tarmac
13/31	4,200 feet (1,280 m) Tarmac

Royal Air Force Metheringham or more simply RAF Metheringham is a former Royal Air Force station situated between the villages of Metheringham and Martin and 10 miles (16 km) south east of Lincoln, England.

Operated as a bomber airfield during the Second World War the station opened in October 1943 and was decommissioned in the spring of 1946.

Although now mostly returned to agricultural and commercial uses the site retains one original runway, the eastern perimeter track and some contemporary buildings together with a No. 106 Squadron RAF memorial garden and a visitor centre.

== History ==
=== Construction and layout ===
The airfield was constructed during 1942 and 1943, when approximately 600 acres (2.4 km^{2}) of farmland and woods were cleared to create the new airfield for No. 5 Group RAF, Bomber Command in Grantham. The station was planned as a Class A airfield standard layout and, although it was named Metheringham, was located largely in the adjoining parish of Martin. The runways were to the standard layout and specification with the main 02/20 runway at 2,000 yd (1,829 m) long and with the 13/31 and 07/25 runways at 1,400 yd (1,280 m).

One of the standard T2 hangars was placed on the technical site located alongside the B1189 road, near Linwood Grange and between runway heads 02 and 07. The second T2 hangar stood just off the east perimeter track between runway heads 25 and 31. A B1 type hangar lay north of runway head 13, near Barff Farm. The bomb dump was built around Blackthorn Holt and Fox Holt woodlands between runway heads 13 and 20.

The administration and accommodation sites were built in the south western corner of the airfield on both sides of the B1189 and consisted of an operations block, ration store, a single officers' mess, one communal other-ranks dining room, one WAAF mess, a gymnasium, four domestic accommodation blocks and a station sick quarters. Living accommodation was designed and scaled to house 1,685 males and 345 females. Many of the buildings were quickly erected Nissen huts.

=== Operations ===
The station became home to No. 106 Squadron RAF, with the first operations from Metheringham in November 1943. By 1945 when hostilities ceased No.106 Squadron had lost 65 Avro Lancaster bombers in operations flown from this airfield.

After VE-Day the Australian No. 467 Squadron RAAF arrived to train with 106 Sqn for planned Tiger Force operations against Japan in the Far East. The end of the war overtook this plan and 467 Sqn disbanded at the start of October 1945. No. 189 Squadron RAF briefly took its place, but this squadron was also soon stood down. No. 106 Squadron remained in service until February 1946 when it too was disbanded. RAF Metheringham was closed to flying and decommissioned shortly thereafter. The station was partially dismantled and the land returned to agricultural use in the early 1960s.

=== Victoria Cross ===
During a raid on Schweinfurt flown from RAF Metheringham during the night of 26–27 April 1944 the flight engineer of a 106 Squadron Lancaster, Sergeant Norman Cyril Jackson, volunteered to climb out along the wing of the aircraft in mid-flight and extinguish a fire started after a German night fighter attack. In the process he became badly burned and was blown off the wing, landing heavily due to his damaged parachute, and spending the rest of the war in POW camps. Sergeant Jackson was awarded the Victoria Cross for his selfless act of extreme bravery in attempting to save the aircraft and crew.

=== Fog dispersal system ===
Metheringham was one of a small number of RAF stations equipped with an early experimental Fog Investigation and Dispersal Operation (FIDO) system. The station was provided with seven large fuel tanks, which pumped petrol into two large pipes running up either side one of their runways. Once the open flame burners along the length of the main runway were ignited the intense rising heat would lift and disperse the fog leaving a visually clear and illuminated runway.

Not all RAF stations were FIDO equipped and when dense fog affected the county it was not unknown for aircraft from several stations to be diverted to RAF Metheringham for a safe landing, returning to their home stations when the foggy weather cleared. Volunteer observers at the surrounding Royal Observer Corps posts were specially trained and provided with coloured rocket flares (Code named Granite) to guide any aircraft lost in thick fog towards the limited number of FIDO equipped stations.

The only other airfields in Lincolnshire fitted with FIDO systems were RAF Fiskerton, RAF Ludford Magna and RAF Sturgate and there were only 15 FIDO stations in the UK, mostly on the east coast.

== Station timeline and resident units ==
Date	Event or unit	Notes
1942	Airfield and accommodation construction commences	
October 1943	RAF Metheringham opened as part of No. 5 Group RAF; Station Identity Code: MN	In 1944 No. 5 Group RAF introduced station control groupings for future operations with all squadrons from stations in the group linking up and flying as a single formation. RAF Metheringham was grouped into No. 5/4 Bases that included itself, RAF Woodhall Spa and RAF Coningsby with the latter acting as the controlling station. No. 5/4 Bases RAF remained under the command of Air Commodore A C H Sharpe until the end of hostilities.
11 November 1943	No. 106 Squadron RAF	Operating Avro Lancasters and relocated from RAF Syerston near Grantham. This squadron operated from Metheringham throughout the remainder of the Second World War and only disbanded on 18 February 1946. (The squadron would eventually reform as a Bomber Command strategic missile squadron in the 1960s.)
June 1945	No. 467 Squadron RAAF	Operating Lancasters. Arrived from RAF Waddington to train for planned Tiger Force operations against Japan. The plans were cancelled after Japan surrendered and the squadron was disbanded at Metheringham in October 1945
October 1945	No. 189 Squadron RAF	Operating Lancasters. The squadron had relocated from RAF Bardney where it had been involved in dropping food relief to the Dutch and repatriating POWs, a role it continued while at Metheringham. The squadron was disbanded on 20 November 1945.
February 1946	Flying ceased from RAF Metheringham	Lancaster bomber aircraft from the disbanded squadrons were flown to RAF Scampton and RAF Hemswell for mothballing, storage and disposal.
May 1946	RAF Metheringham decommissioned and closed	

== Metheringham in the media ==
RAF Metheringham was utilised in the developmental testing of the experimental programme to assist aircraft landing in foggy conditions (the system eventually known by the acronym FIDO) and the station featured in the official RAF training film. Although the year of the film production is unknown, it references 21 December in relation to the system testing at Metheringham. The actual reference to RAF Metheringham in the film is brief but depicts the role that the station contributed.

== Post war, museum and squadron memorial ==
Although the airfield site would remain fairly intact into the 1950s, its hangars and most of the domestic buildings had been demolished by 1970. The airfield itself had been sold off for farming in 1961/62 with some hardstandings removed. Parts of runways 07/25 and 13/31 were pressed into service to reinstate two minor roads that had been subsumed into the airfield in 1942. Several technical site buildings still remain in use, converted to modern commercial purposes. Some signs of this once active airfield still remain. On the original communal accommodation site south-south-west of the main airfield, near King's Covert and Westmoor Farm, many of the original buildings still stand.

The former station's ration store has now been restored and houses the Metheringham Airfield Visitor Centre, featuring an exhibition of photographs and memorabilia recalling life on an operational Second World War airfield. The visitor centre opens on Wednesday, Saturday and Sunday afternoons between the last week of March and the last week of October each year.

Close by are the remains of the concrete runways and perimeter tracks, and the memorial garden and plinth dedicated to No. 106 Squadron. A ghostly young lady is said to haunt the area close to the airfield.

== Gallery ==
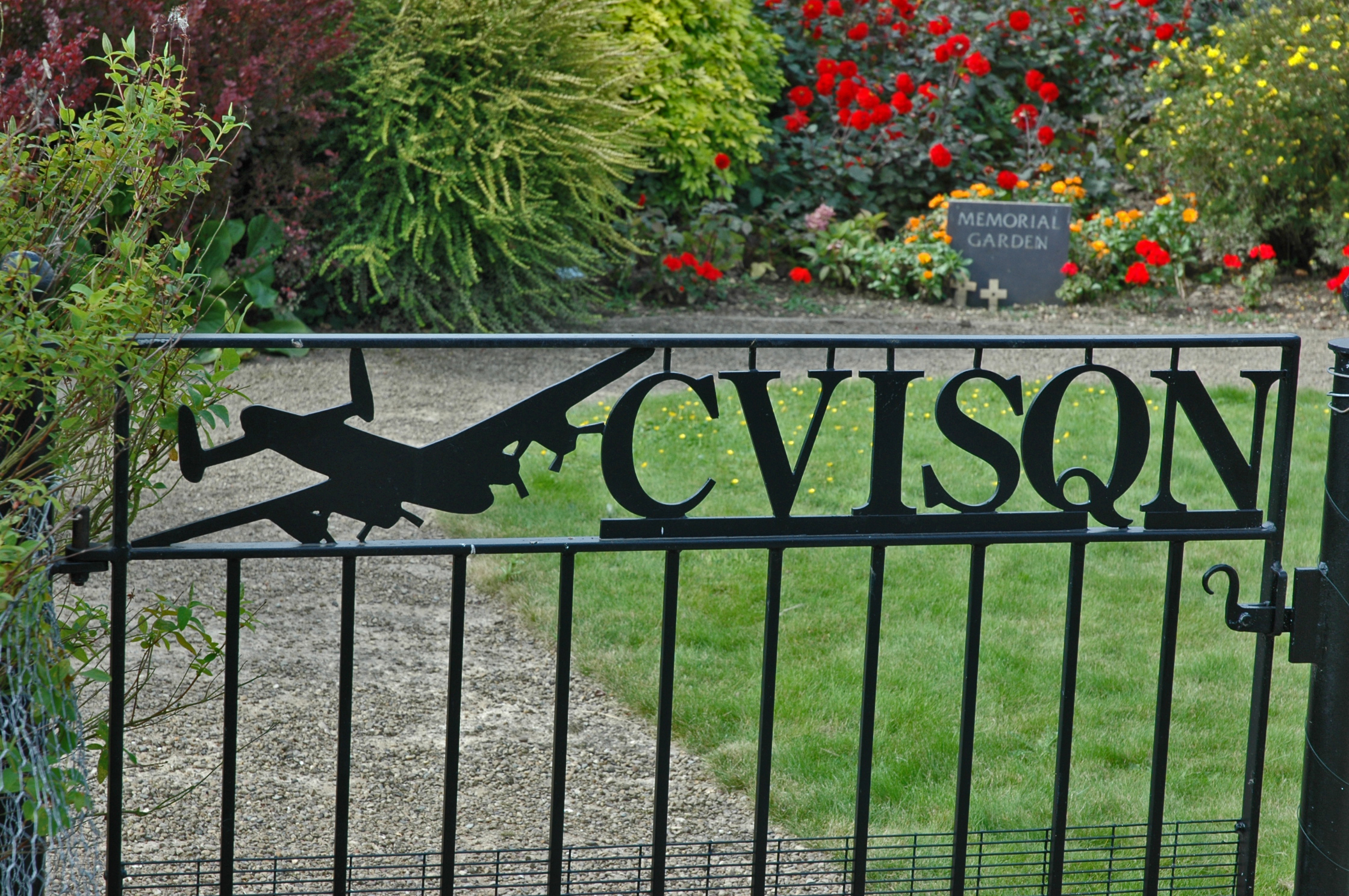
106 Squadron Memorial Garden.

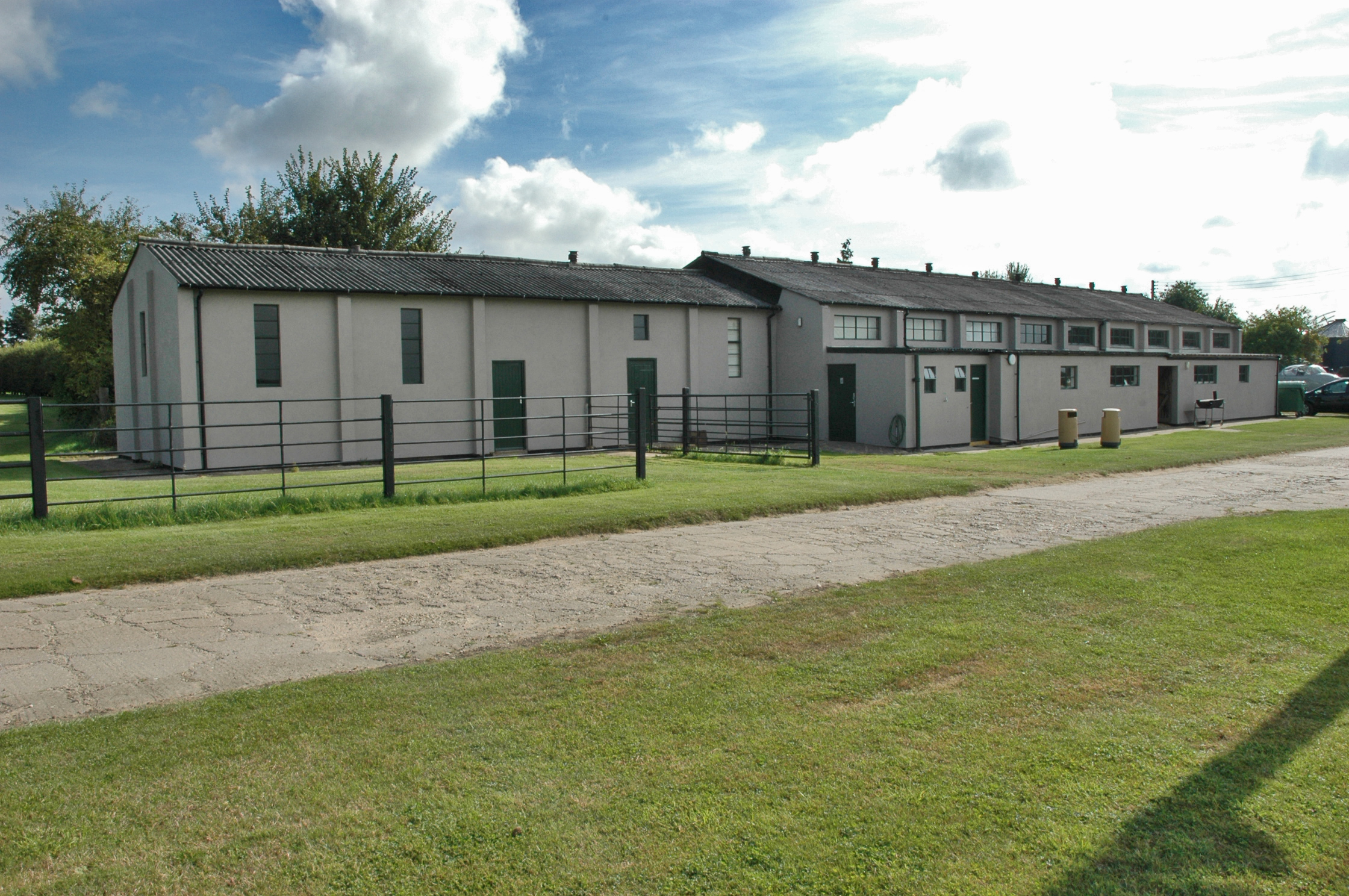
Restored Station Gymnasium

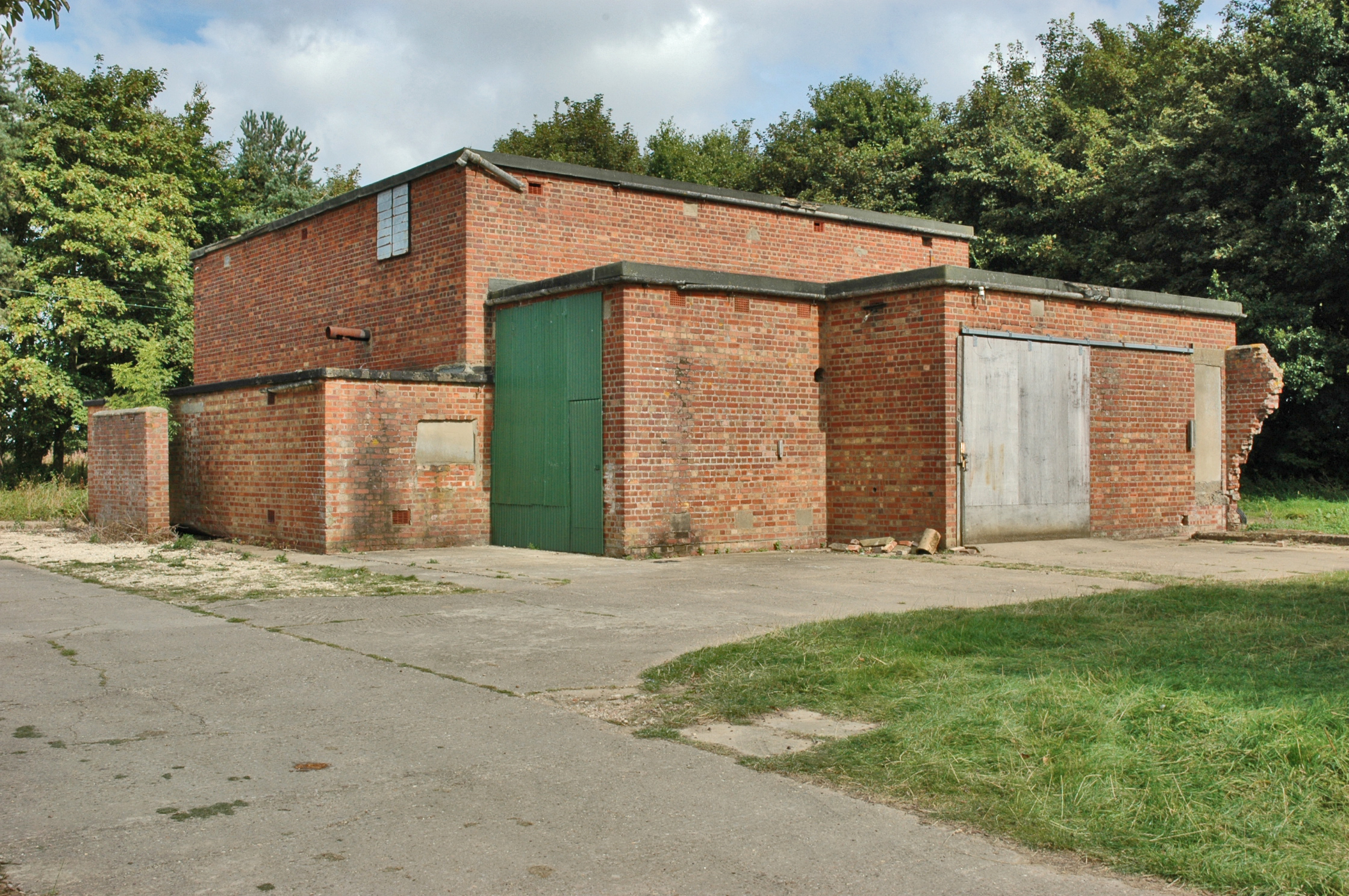
Standby Generator Set House.

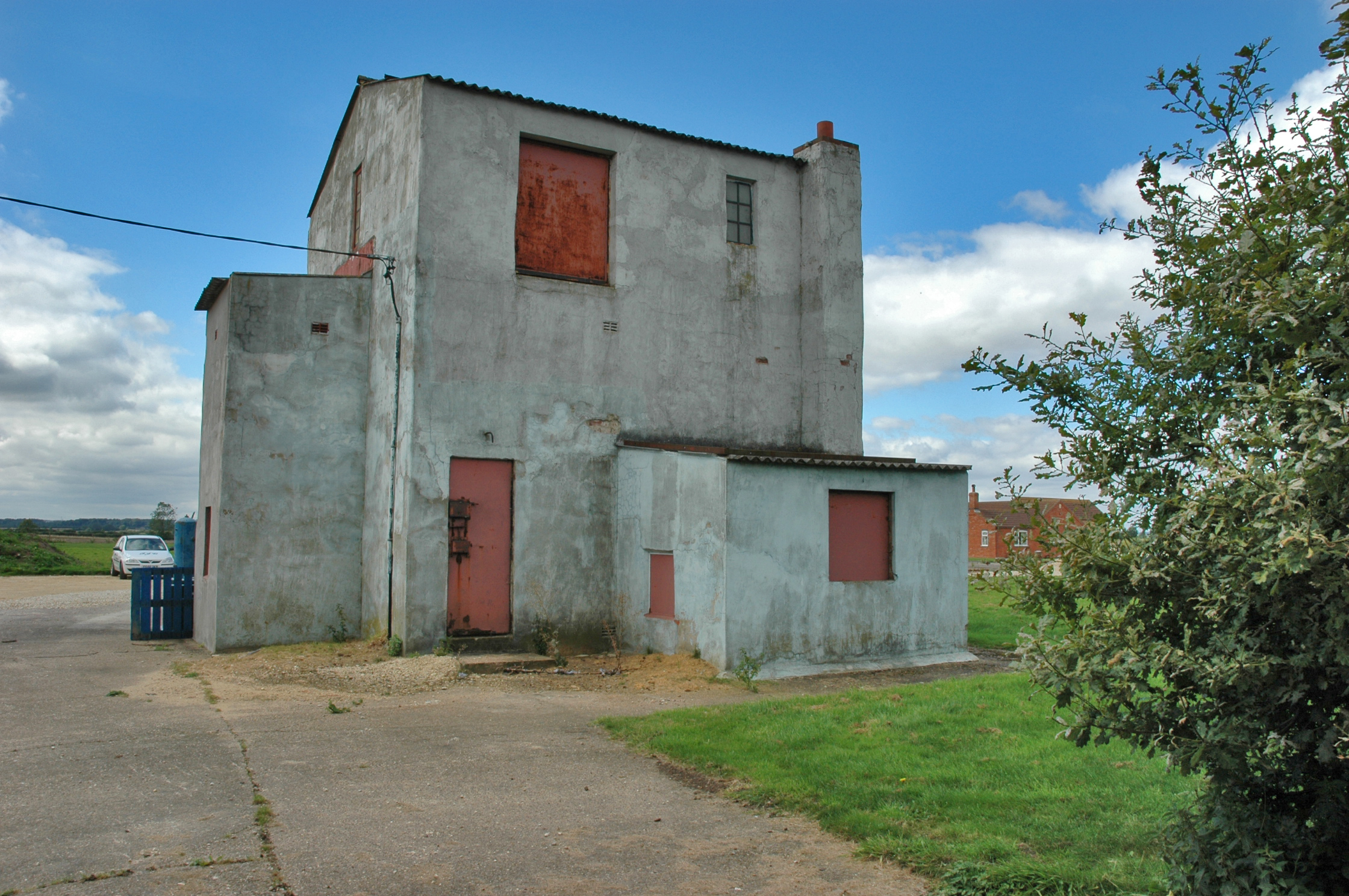
Synthetic Bombing Trainer.

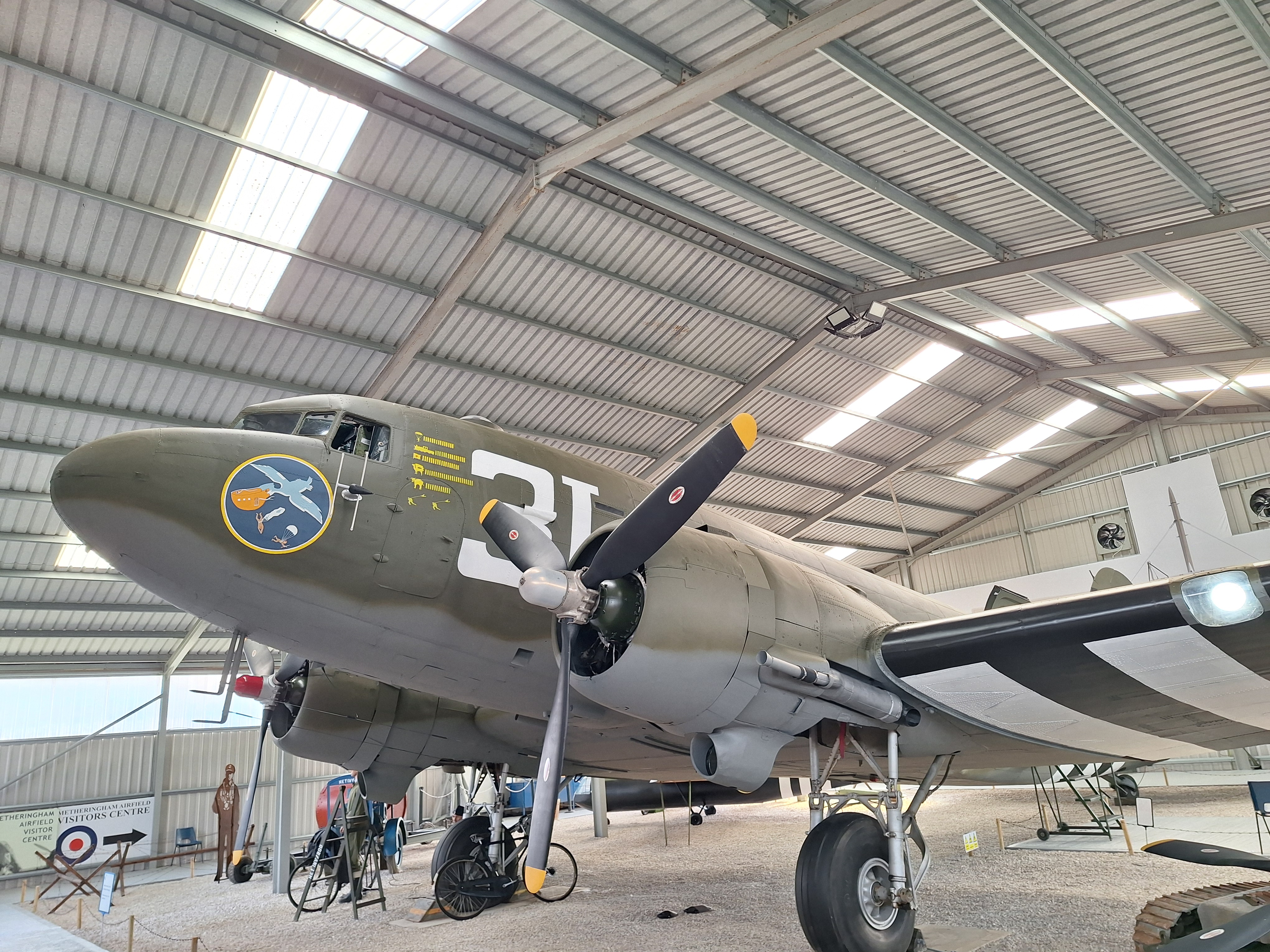
C-47 Dakota(KG651) on display in Metheringham Airfield Visitor Center with USAAF camo

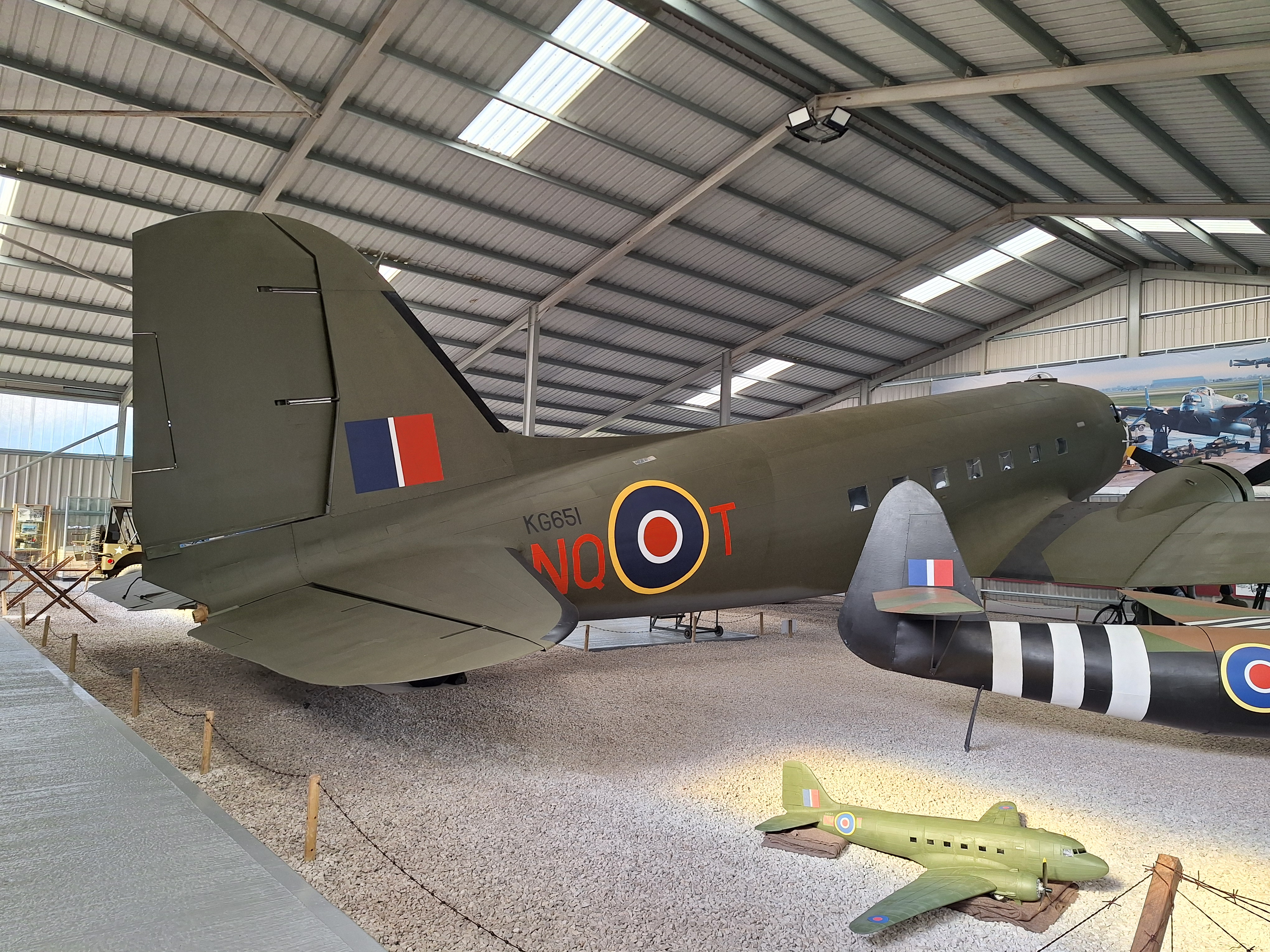
C-47 Dakota(KG651) with original RAF camo
