= No. 463 Squadron RAAF =

Royal Australian Air Force squadron

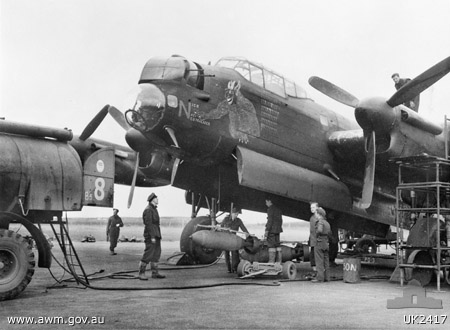
- A No. 463 Squadron Lancaster in 1944
- Active: 1943–1945
- Country: Australia
- Allegiance: United Kingdom
- Branch: Royal Australian Air Force
- Role: Bomber Squadron
- Part of: No. 5 Group RAF, Bomber Command
- Motto: Press on Regardless
- Battle honours: Tirpitz; Fortress Europe, 1940–1944; France and Germany, 1944–1945; Ruhr, 1940–1945; Berlin, 1940–1945; German Ports, 1940–1945; Normandy, 1944; Walcheren; Bergen

Insignia
- Squadron Badge heraldry: In front of a star of seven points, four sledge hammers in saltire
- Squadron Codes: PO (November 1943 – November 1943); JO (December 1943 – September 1945)

Aircraft flown
- Bomber: Avro Lancaster

No. 463 Squadron RAAF was a Royal Australian Air Force heavy bomber squadron during World War II. The squadron was formed in the United Kingdom in late 1943 from personnel and aircraft allocated from No. 467 Squadron RAAF. The squadron was equipped with Avro Lancaster bombers and flew its first raids on Germany immediately after being formed. Operating as part of RAF Bomber Command No. 463 Squadron conducted raids against cities, industrial facilities and military targets in Germany, France and Norway throughout 1944 and until the end of the war in May 1945. Following the war, the squadron evacuated Allied prisoners of war from Europe until it was disbanded in late 1945.

== History ==
No. 463 Squadron was raised as an Article XV squadron under the terms of the Empire Air Training Scheme in the United Kingdom, and allocated to the Royal Australian Air Force. It came into being on 25 November 1943 when a flight of Avro Lancaster heavy bombers and supporting personnel were transferred from another Australian squadron, No. 467 Squadron RAAF. Upon formation, the squadron was established at RAF Waddington, in Lincolnshire, and its first commanding officer was Wing Commander Rollo Kingsford-Smith. It was assigned to No. 5 Group RAF.

The squadron commenced operations within a day of its formation, with its first mission being a night bombing mission over Berlin. This attack resulted in the loss of one Lancaster, but also saw the squadron shoot down its first German aircraft, a Junkers Ju 88 night fighter. Following its first operation, the squadron received more aircraft and although it was eventually expanded to two flights, it never achieved full strength of three flights.

For the first part of the squadron's existence, its operations were mainly focused on night bombing raids over Germany, attacking mainly the industrial areas of Berlin and the Ruhr. Later, as the squadron's focus shifted to targets in France during the lead up to the Normandy invasion. In early May, the squadron attacked German armoured formations in France and targeted German airfields; losses were heavy during these operations with four aircraft being lost in a single raid on 10/11 May. On the eve of D-Day, they attacked German coastal positions overlooking Omaha Beach in support of the Allied landings. Following the successful lodgement, the squadron continued to undertake ground support operations, and began daylight missions.

Aerial cinematography for intelligence and public morale purposes was another role of 463 Squadron. At least three Lancasters from 463 Sqn were fitted with Eyemo 35 mm cinecameras by the RAF Film Production Unit. In this capacity, some of the squadron's Lancasters were involved in attacks on the German battleship Tirpitz, in Norway. One crew set an endurance record, flying a 14 1/2 hour mission to film Operation Catechism: the final attack on Tirpitz, in Tromsø Fjord, on 12 November 1944.

During 1945, the squadron's aircraft continued to fly operations against targets in Germany, and also in support of ground troops as the Allies advanced towards Germany. Daylight raids were also undertaken, and during one such raid on Hamburg in early April 1945, the squadron's aircraft came up against German Me 262 jet fighters for the first time. The squadron's final offensive operation of the war came on Anzac Day 1945, when 14 Lancasters from No. 463 Squadron bombed the Tonsberg oil refinery; one aircraft was lost during this raid, with the crew being interned in Sweden for the remainder of the war. Shortly afterwards, the squadron began transport duties, ferrying liberated Allied prisoners of war back to the United Kingdom.

In July, the squadron relocated to RAF Skellingthorpe, remaining there until it was disbanded in September or October 1945. (Note: The Australian War Memorial lists the squadron's date of disbandment as 25 September 1945, while Eather lists it as 29 October 1945.) Prior to its disbandment, it had been intended that No. 463 Squadron would form part of "Tiger Force", the British and Commonwealth contribution to the air forces allocated to attack Japan as part of Operation Downfall; however, the war in the Pacific ended before they could be deployed.

Throughout the course of the war, No. 463 Squadron undertook 2,525 sorties, and expended over 11,000 tons of bombs. The squadron was credited with shooting down six German aircraft, including one Bf 110 night fighter that was shot down by the crew of one Lancaster as it stalked another. Casualties amongst the squadron's aircrew were heavy, and No. 463 had the highest casualty rate of any Australian bomber squadron deployed to Europe during the war, with 78 aircraft being lost and 546 personnel being killed; of these 225 were Australian.

== Aircraft operated ==
Aircraft operated by no. 463 Squadron RAAF, data from
| From | To | Aircraft | Version |
|---|---|---|---|
| November 1943 | September 1945 | Avro Lancaster | Mks.I, III |

== Squadron bases ==
Bases and airfields used by no. 463 Squadron RAAF, data from
| From | To | Base |
|---|---|---|
| 25 November 1943 | 3 July 1945 | RAF Waddington, Lincolnshire |
| 3 July 1945 | 25 September 1945 | RAF Skellingthorpe, Lincolnshire |

== Commanding officers ==
Officers commanding no. 463 Squadron RAAF, data from
| From | To | Name |
|---|---|---|
| 25 November 1943 | 19 June 1944 | Wing Commander R. "Rollo" Kingsford-Smith, DSO, DFC, AM(US) |
| 19 June 1944 | 24 June 1944 (Shot down) | Flight Lieutenant D.R. Donaldson (acting), DFC, AFC |
| 25 June 1944 | 18 January 1945 | Wing Commander W.A. Forbes, DSO, DFC |
| 18 January 1945 | July 1945 | Wing Commander K.M Kemp, DFC |
| July 1945 | 25 September 1945 | Wing Commander M.G. "Mick" Cowan, DSO |
