= Red Arrows =

Aerobatics display team of the Royal Air Force

Red Arrows Royal Air Force Aerobatic Team
- Red Arrows badge
- Active: 1964 – present
- Country: United Kingdom
- Branch: Royal Air Force
- Role: Aerobatic display team
- Size: 11 pilots 100 engineering & support staff
- Part of: No. 1 Group
- Home station: RAF Waddington
- Nickname: "The Reds"
- Motto: Éclat (French for 'Excellence')
- Colours: Red, white and blue
- Website: Official website

Commanders
- Officer Commanding: Wing Commander Sasha Nash
- Team Leader (Red 1): Squadron leader James Turner
- Display Supervisor (Red 10): Squadron Leader Stuart Roberts

Aircraft flown
- Trainer: Hawk T1A

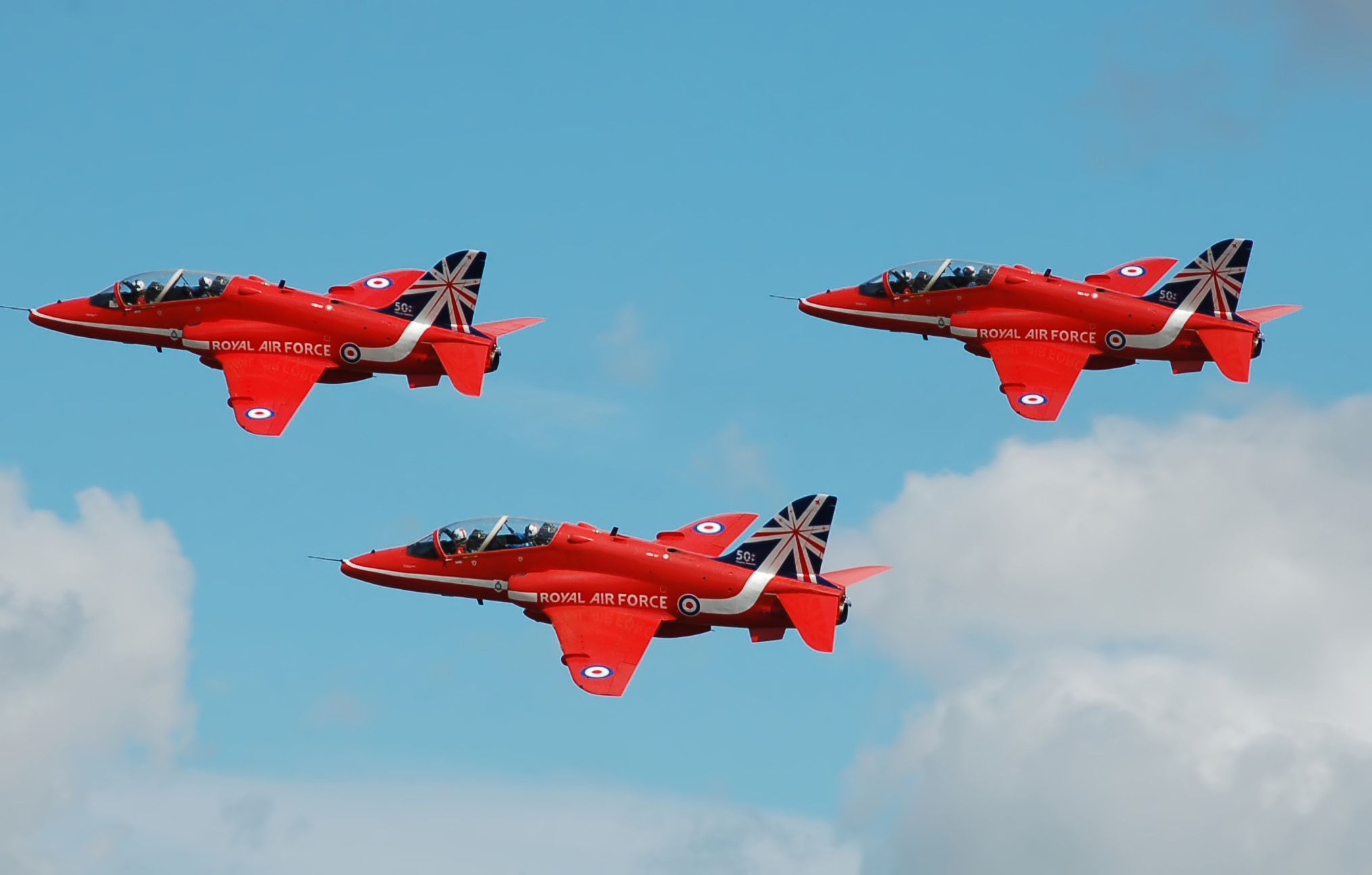
The RAF Red Arrows depart the 2014 Royal International Air Tattoo, England, in a colour scheme that commemorates their 50th year.

The Red Arrows, officially known as the Royal Air Force Aerobatic Team, is the aerobatics display team of the Royal Air Force (RAF) based at RAF Waddington. The team was formed in late 1964 as an all-Royal Air Force team, replacing several unofficial teams that had been sponsored by RAF commands.

The Red Arrows have a prominent place in British popular culture, with their aerobatic displays a fixture of British summer events. The badge of the Red Arrows shows the aircraft in their trademark diamond nine formation, with the motto Éclat, a French word meaning "brilliance" or "excellence".

The four published roles of the Red Arrows are:

- Representing and showcasing the skills and values of the Royal Air Force
- Supporting British industry
- Assisting in defence diplomacy
- Aiding recruitment for the UK Armed Forces

Initially, they were equipped with seven Folland Gnat trainers inherited from the RAF Yellowjacks display team. This aircraft was chosen because it was less expensive to operate than front-line fighters. In their first season, they flew at 65 shows across Europe. In 1966, the team was increased to nine members, enabling them to develop their Diamond Nine formation. In late 1979, they switched to the BAE Hawk trainer. The Red Arrows have performed over 4,800 displays in 57 countries worldwide.

The team celebrated their 60th Diamond Season in 2024, with an anniversary decal applied to the fuselage and fin, as well as a special 'anniversary break' manoeuvre being included in the display.

== History ==
=== Predecessors ===
The Red Arrows were not the first RAF aerobatics team. An RAF pageant was held at Hendon in 1920 with teams from front-line biplane squadrons.

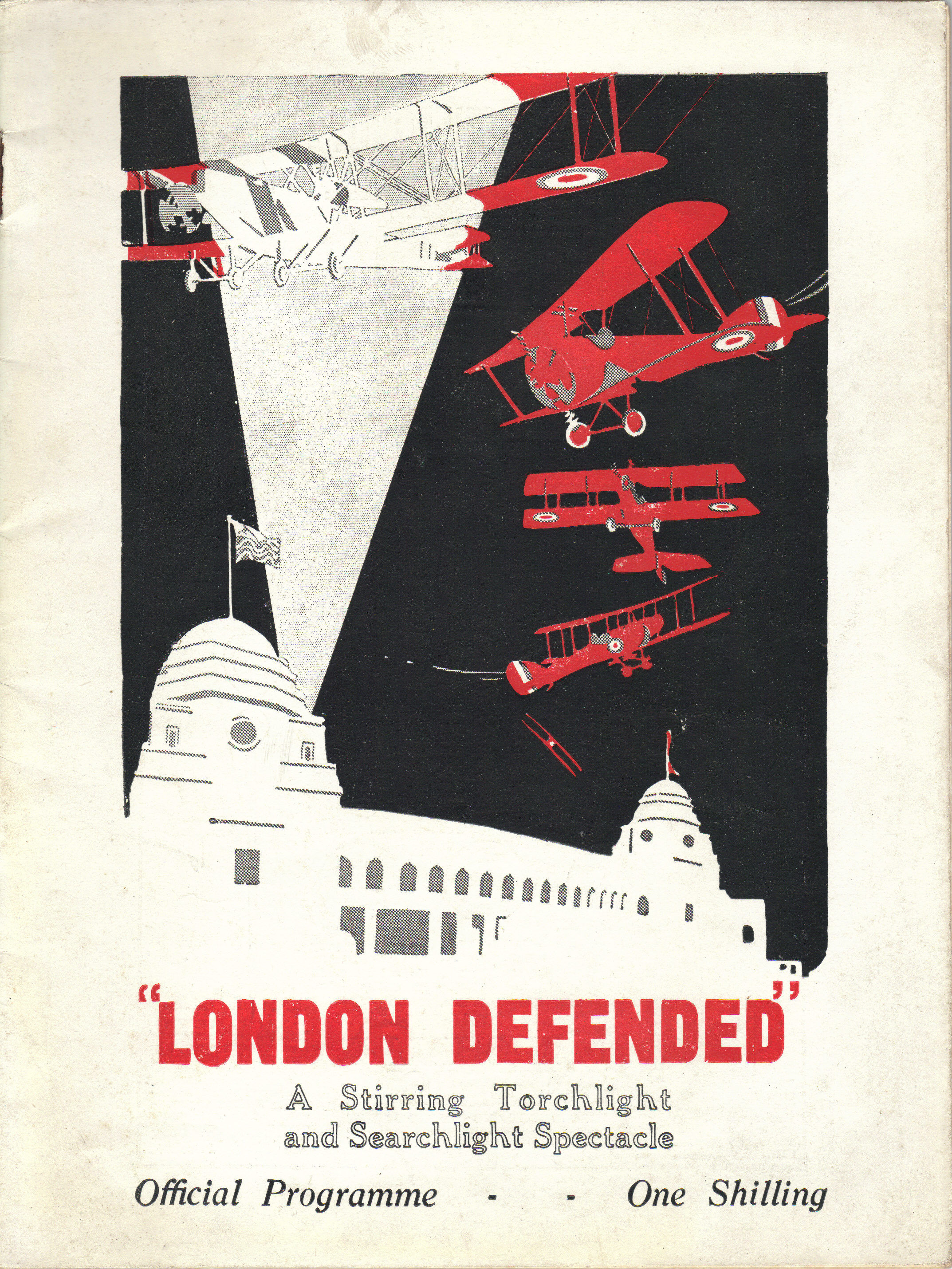
"London Defended" 1925 Official Programme

In 1925, No. 32 Squadron RAF flew an air display six nights a week entitled "London Defended" at the British Empire Exhibition. Similar to the display they had done the previous year, when the aircraft were painted black, it consisted of a night-time air display over the Wembley Exhibition flying RAF Sopwith Snipes which were painted red for the display and fitted with white lights on the wings, tail, and fuselage. The display involved firing blank ammunition into the stadium crowds and dropping pyrotechnics from the aeroplanes to simulate shrapnel from guns on the ground. Explosions on the ground also produced the effect of bombs being dropped into the stadium by the aeroplanes. One of the pilots in the display was Flying Officer C. W. A. Scott, who later became famous for breaking three England–Australia solo flight records and winning the MacRobertson Air Race with co-pilot Tom Campbell Black in 1934.

In 1947, the first jet team of three de Havilland Vampires came from RAF Odiham Fighter Wing. Various teams flew the Vampire, and in 1950, No. 72 Squadron was flying a team of seven. No. 54 Squadron became the first RAF jet formation team to use smoke trails. Vampires were replaced by Gloster Meteors, No. 66 Squadron developing a formation team of six aircraft.

Hawker Hunter aircraft were first used for aerobatics teams in 1955, when No. 54 Squadron flew a formation of four.

The official RAF team was provided by No. 111 Squadron in 1956, and for the first time, the aircraft had a special colour scheme, which was an all-black finish. After a demonstration in France, they were hailed as "Les Fleches Noires" and from then on known as the Black Arrows. This team became the first team to fly a five-Hunter formation. In 1958, the Black Arrows performed a loop and barrel roll of 22 Hunters, a world record for the greatest number of aircraft looped in formation. The Black Arrows were the premier team until 1961, when the Blue Diamonds (No. 92 Squadron) continued their role, flying 16 blue Hunters.

In 1960, No. 74 Squadron were the first RAF squadron to be equipped with the supersonic English Electric Lightning fighter and performed wing-overs and rolls with nine aircraft in tight formation. They sometimes gave co-ordinated displays with the Blue Diamonds. Yet another aerobatics team was formed in 1960 by No. 56 Squadron, the Firebirds, with nine red and silver Lightnings.

In 1964, the Red Pelicans, flying six BAC Jet Provost T Mk 4 trainer aircraft, assumed the role of the RAF's leading display team. In that same year, a team of five yellow Gnat trainers from No 4 Flying Training School displayed at the Farnborough Airshow. This team became known as the Yellowjacks after Flight Lieutenant Lee Jones's call sign, "Yellowjack".

In 1964, all the RAF display teams were amalgamated, as it was feared pilots were spending too much time practising formation aerobatics rather than operational training. The new team name took the word "red" from the fact that the Red Pelicans' planes had been painted red (for safety reasons, as it was a far clearer and more visible colour in the sky) and "arrows" after the Black Arrows.

=== Establishment ===
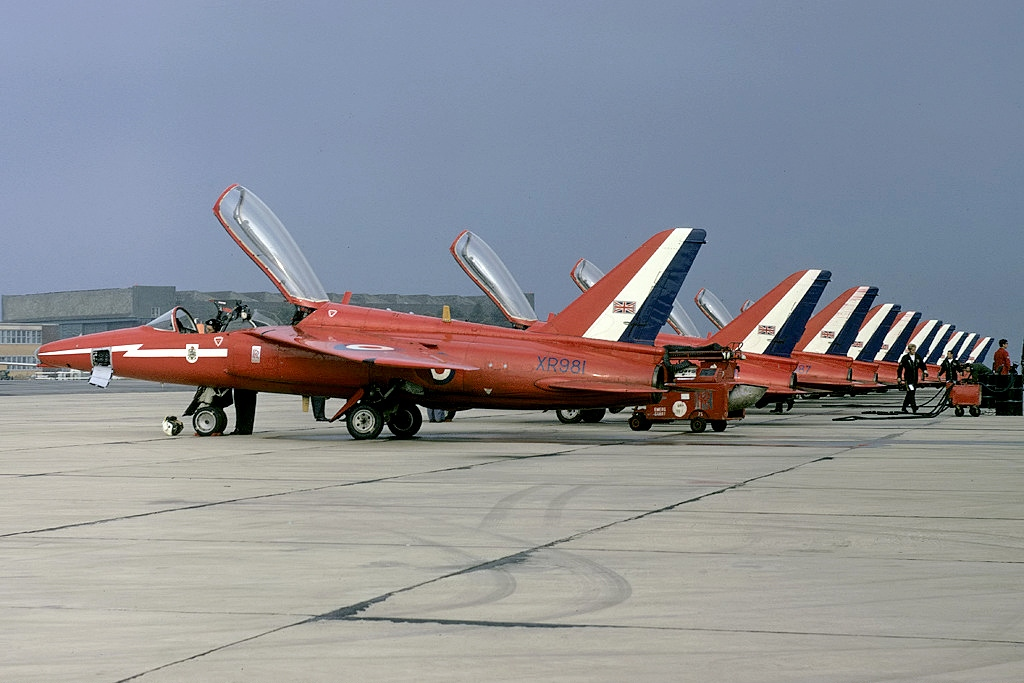
Gnat T.1s on the flightline at RAF Little Rissington in 1973

The Royal Air Force Aerobatic Team, the formal name of the Red Arrows, began life at RAF Little Rissington in Gloucestershire, then the Central Flying School before moving to RAF Fairford. The Red Arrows moved to RAF Kemble, now Cotswold Airport, in 1966 after RAF Fairford became the place of choice for BAC to run test flights for the Concorde supersonic airliner. When RAF Scampton (near Lincoln) became the CFS headquarters in 1983, the Red Arrows moved there. As an economy measure, Scampton closed in 1995, so the Red Arrows moved 20 miles (32 km) to RAF Cranwell; however, as they still used the air space above Scampton, the emergency facilities and runways had to be maintained. On 21 December 2000, the Red Arrows returned to RAF Scampton. On 13 October 2022, the Red Arrows moved to their new base at RAF Waddington.

The first team, led by Flight Lieutenant Lee Jones, had seven display pilots and flew the Folland Gnat T1 jet trainer. The first display in the UK was on 6 May 1965, at Little Rissington for a press day. At the subsequent National Air Day display, three days later, at Clermont Ferrand in France, one French journalist described the team as "Les Fleches Rouges", confirming the name "The Red Arrows". By the end of their first season, the Red Arrows had displayed 65 times in Britain, France, Italy, the Netherlands, Germany, and Belgium and were awarded the Britannia Trophy by the Royal Aero Club for their contribution to aviation.

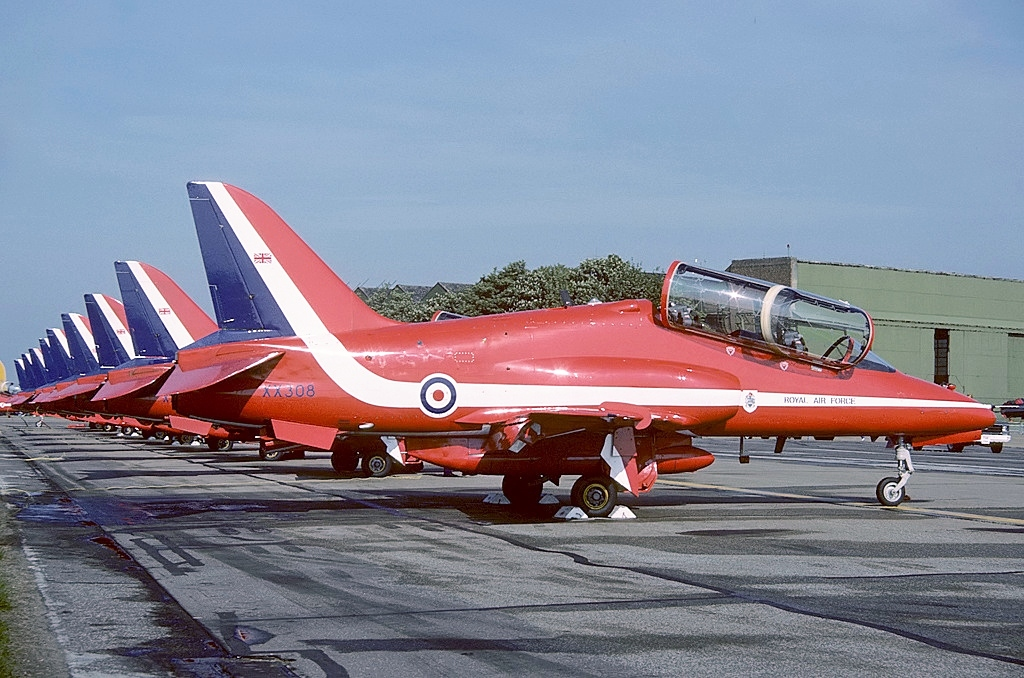
Hawk T.1s on the flightline at RAF Mildenhall in 1985

In 1968, the then team leader (Sqn Ldr Ray Hanna) expanded the team from seven to nine jets, as he wanted to expand the team's capabilities and the permutations of formation patterns. During this season, the 'Diamond Nine' pattern was formed and it has remained the team's trademark pattern ever since. Ray Hanna served as Red Leader for three consecutive years until 1968 and was recalled to supersede Squadron Leader Timothy Nelson for the 1969 display season, a record four seasons as Leader, which still stands. For his considerable achievements of airmanship with the team, Ray Hanna was awarded a bar to his existing Air Force Cross.

After displaying 1,292 times in the Folland Gnat, the Red Arrows took delivery of the BAE Hawk in 1979. Since being introduced into service with the Red Arrows, the Hawk has performed with the Red Arrows in 50 countries.

=== Later years ===
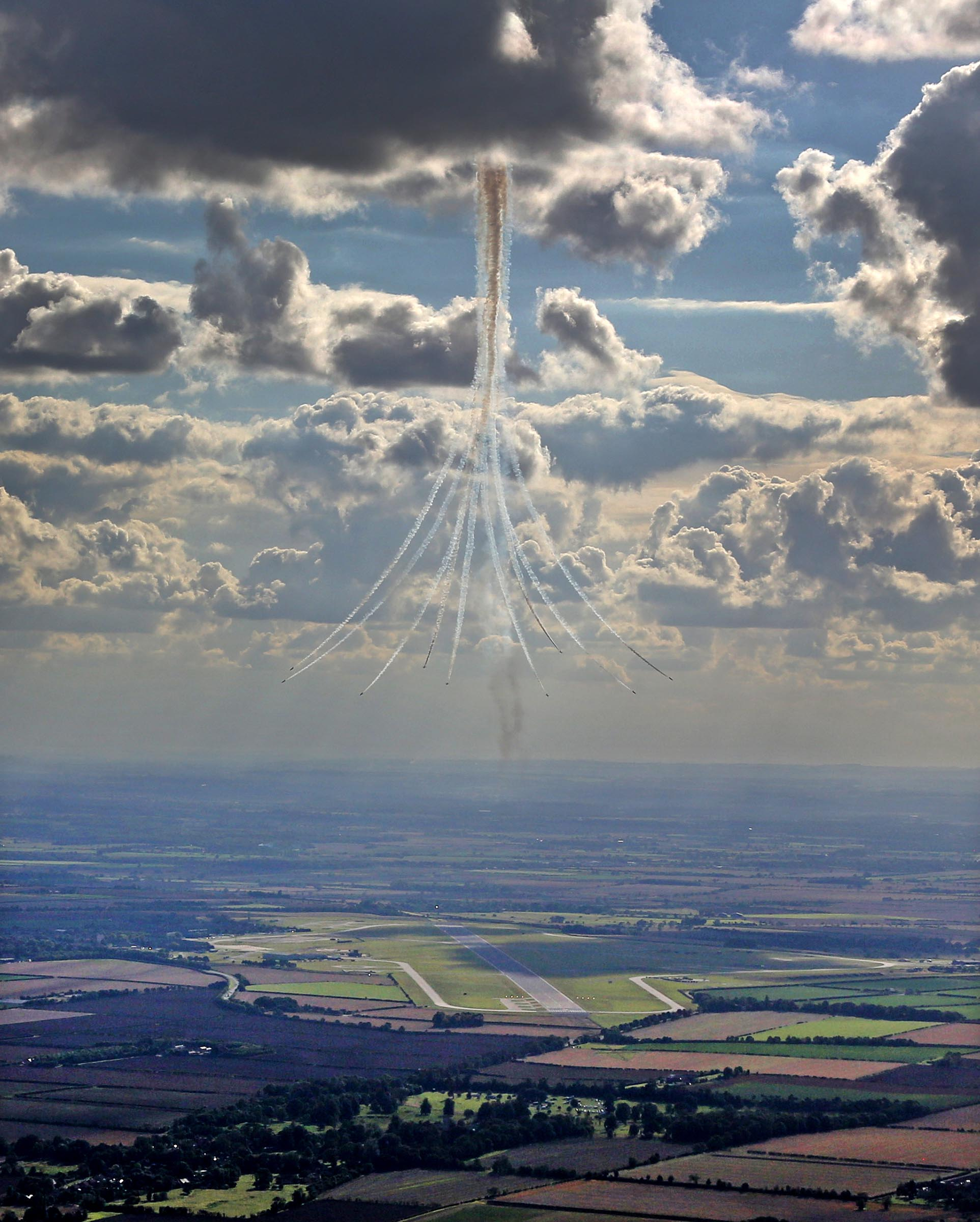
Red Arrows perform a manoeuvre called the "Spaghetti Break" over RAF Scampton, September 2015

The Duchess of York visited Scampton, on Thursday 7 May 1987. The team leader was Sqn Ldr Richard Thomas, Red Five was Sqn Ldr Al Chubb, and team manager was Sqn Ldr Henry Ploszek. She had arrived in an HS 146 aircraft. The station commander was Group Captain Robin Chambers, and the Commandant of the CFS was Air Commodore David Leppard. With the Duke, she went on a 55-minute flight with Sqn Ldr David Walby (1945-93) in a two-seater 'XX692' with aerobatics. She had gained her pilot's licence 30 January 1987, after flying 41 hours in a Piper Warrior, owned by Lord Waterpark.

In July 2004, speculation surfaced in the British media that the Red Arrows would be disbanded, after a defence spending review, due to running costs between £5 million and £6 million. The Arrows were not disbanded and their expense has been justified through their public relations benefit of helping to develop business in the defence industry and promoting recruitment for the RAF. According to the BBC, disbanding the Red Arrows will be highly unlikely, as they are a considerable attraction throughout the world. This was reiterated by Prime Minister David Cameron on 20 February 2013, when he guaranteed the estimated £9m per annum costs while visiting India to discuss a possible sale of Hawk aircraft to be used by India's military aerobatics team, the Surya Kiran.

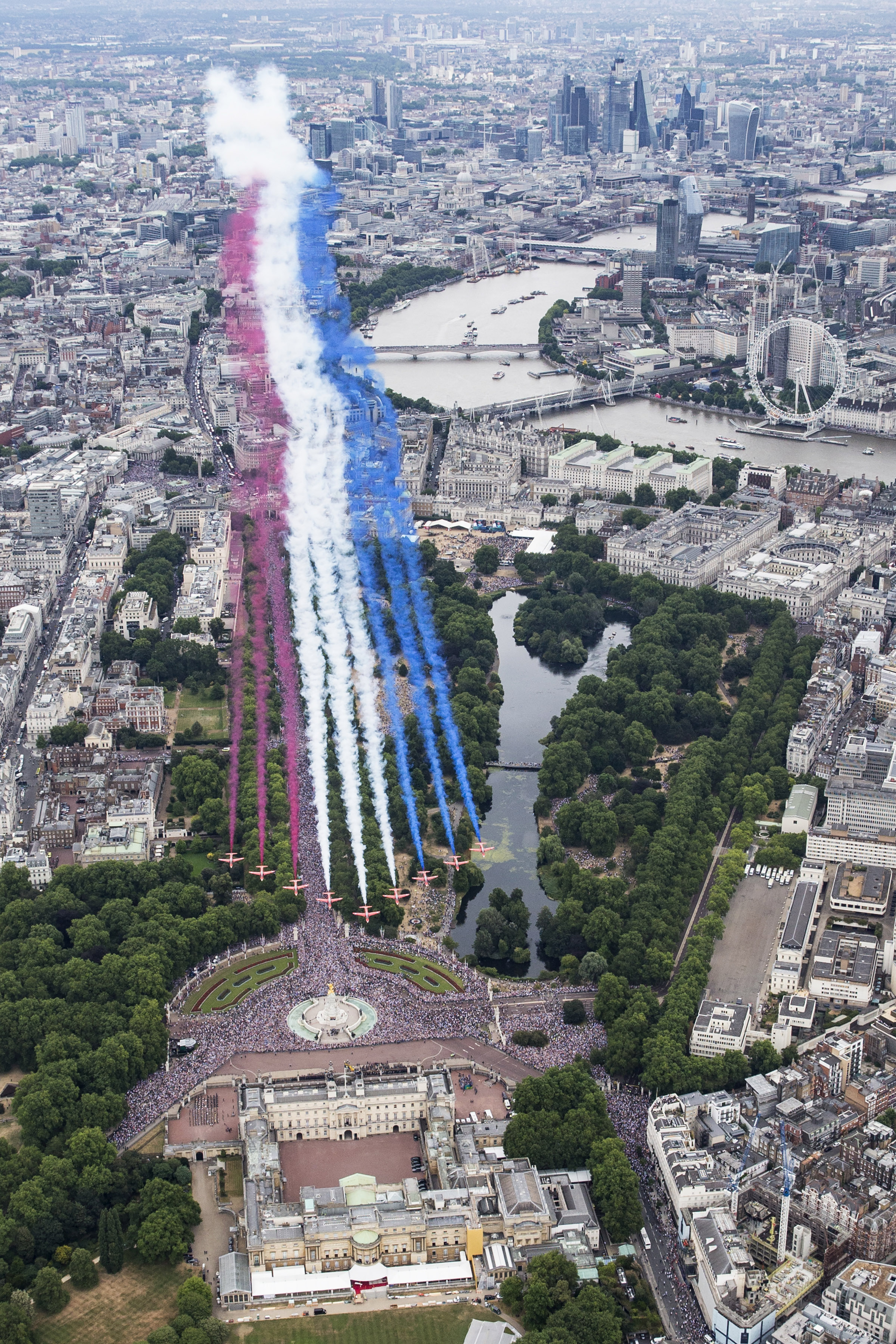
Red Arrows flying over London in 2018 during the RAF centenary celebrations

With the planned closure of RAF Scampton, the future home of the Red Arrows became uncertain. On 20 May 2008, months of speculation were ended when it was revealed that the Ministry of Defence (MoD) were moving the Red Arrows to nearby RAF Waddington. However, in December 2011, those plans were put under review. The MoD confirmed in June 2012 that the Red Arrows would remain at RAF Scampton until at least the end of the decade. Scampton's runway was resurfaced as a result.

In July 2018 the RAF announced that RAF Scampton, the wartime base of No. 617 Squadron also known as The Dambusters, would close by 2022. In March 2019, the MoD indicated that RAF Waddington, alongside RAF Leeming and RAF Wittering, was being considered as their future home. It was confirmed in May 2020 that Waddington had been selected. The move was completed on 13 October 2022. The Red Arrows will continue to use airspace above RAF Scampton for their training.

=== Misconduct inquiry ===
In December 2021, Chief of the Air Staff Mike Wigston ordered an RAF inquiry into the Red Arrows, which The Times later reported related to allegations of bullying, misogyny, sexual harassment and drunkenness. Up to 40 personnel on the squadron, many of whom were female, described the culture as "toxic". While the inquiry was ongoing some pilots left, leaving a smaller display team. An inquiry delivered in November 2022 concluded that at least two pilots from the team had enough of a service case against them to warrant their discharge from the service. In November 2022 it was announced that the commanding officer had been suspended for investigations. The whole team were required to attend courses on "unacceptable behaviour" and "active bystander" training after one former female member claimed that newly arrived females on the team were seen as "fresh meat", and would be inundated with unwanted WhatsApp messages. Ultimately two pilots were discharged and nine personnel were sanctioned.

A further formal investigation into the command, leadership, and management of the squadron was conducted in 2023, and redacted versions of both reports were published on 1 November 2023. Chief of the Air Staff Sir Richard Knighton apologised and stated "I was appalled when I read the investigations' findings" and that few serving at that time were still in the squadron and he had confidence in the current command. Four of the victims who made formal complaints subsequently criticised the inquiry in a Sky News documentary, and stated that the RAF had falsely told a parliamentary committee that the sexism allegations did not meet a criminal threshold.

== Pilots ==
Since 1966, the team has had nine display pilots each year, all volunteers. Pilots must have completed one or more operational tours on a fast jet such as the Tornado, Harrier, or Typhoon, have accumulated at least 1,500 flying hours, and have been assessed as above average in their operational role to be eligible. Even then, more than ten pilots apply for each place on the team. Pilots stay with the Red Arrows for a three-year tour of duty. Three pilots are changed every year, such that normally three first-year pilots, three second-year pilots, and three in their final year are on the team. The team leader also spends three years with the team. The 'Boss', as they are known to the rest of the team, is always a pilot who has previously completed a three-year tour with the Red Arrows, often (although not always) including a season as the leader of the Synchro Pair.

During the second half of each display, the Red Arrows split into two sections. Reds 1 to 5 are known as 'Enid' (named after Enid Blyton, author of the Famous Five books) and Reds 6 to 9 are known as 'Hanna' (named after Red Arrows' founding member Squadron Leader Ray Hanna). Enid continue to perform close-formation aerobatics, while Hanna perform more dynamic manoeuvres. Red 6 (Synchro Leader) and Red 7 (Synchro 2) make up the Synchro Pair and they perform a series of opposition passes during this second half. At the end of each season, one of that year's new pilots will be chosen to be Red 7 for the following season, with that year's Red 7 taking over as Red 6.

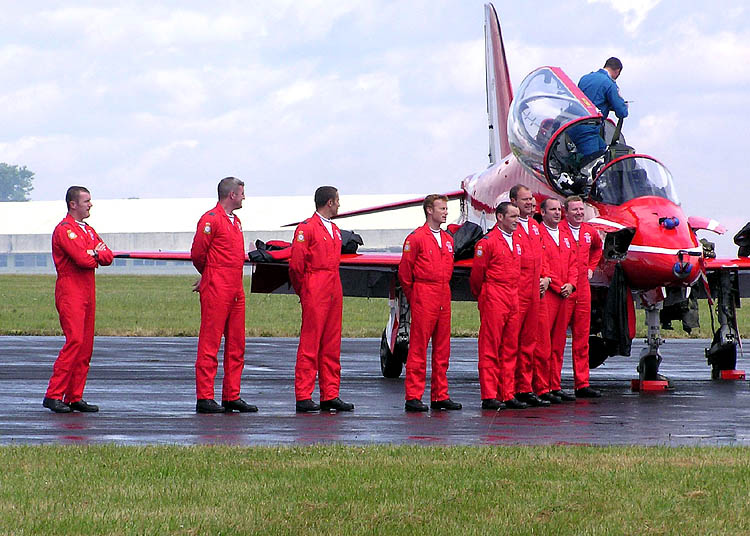
The pilots line up for an official photo after their display in June 2004

The Reds have no reserve pilots, as spare pilots would not perform often enough to fly to the standard required, nor would they be able to learn the intricacies of each position in the formation. If one of the pilots is not able to fly, the team flies an eight-plane formation. However, if the Team Leader, 'Red 1', is unable to fly, then the team does not display at all. Each pilot always flies the same position in the formation during a season. The pilots spend six months from October to April practising for the display season. Pilots wear green flying suits during training, and are only allowed to wear their red flying suits once they are awarded their Public Display Authority at the end of winter training.

The new pilots joining the team spend their first season flying at the front of the formation near the team leader. As their experience and proficiency improve, they move to positions further back in the formation in their second and third seasons. Pilots who start on the left of the formation stay on that side for the duration of their three-year tour; the pilots on the right side stay on the right. The exception to this are Reds 6 and 7 (the Synchro Pair), who fly in the 'stem' of the formation - the two positions behind the team leader.

During an aerobatics display, Red Arrows pilots experience forces up to five times that of gravity (1g), and when performing the aerobatic manoeuvre 'Vixen Break', forces up to 7g can be reached, close to the 8g structural limit of the aircraft.

As well as the nine pilots, 'Red 10', who is the team supervisor, is a fully qualified Hawk pilot who flies the tenth aircraft when the Red Arrows are away from base. This means the team have a reserve aircraft at the display site. Red 10's duties include co-ordination of all practices and displays and acting as the team's ground safety officer. Red 10 often flies TV cameramen and photographers for air-to-air pictures of the Red Arrows and also provides the commentary for all of the team's displays.

On 13 May 2009, it was announced that the Red Arrows would include their first female display pilot. Flt Lt Kirsty Moore (née Stewart) joined for the 2010 season. Flt Lt Moore was not the first female to apply to become a Red Arrow, but was the first to be taken forward to the intense final selection process. She joined the RAF in 1998 and was a qualified flying instructor on the Hawk aircraft at RAF Valley. Prior to joining the team, she flew the Tornado GR4 at RAF Marham.

== The 'Blues' ==
The engineering and support team that supports the Red Arrows is known as "The Blues" and consists of more than 90 members drawn from a wide-variety of technical and support trades in the RAF. The vast majority of this team is commanded by the Senior Engineering Officer, who is responsible for all engineering and logistics delivery of the aircraft and display support; including the Red Arrow's famous red, white and blue smoke trails. Other display support areas are led by a Chief of Staff, PR Manager and Operations Officer.

The diverse constitution of the Blues team includes aircraft technicians, survival equipment specialists, drivers, logisticians, photographers and operations specialists. Each season up to eleven members of the Blues are selected to be members of the 'Circus'. The position of "Circus 1" (the engineer who accompanies Red 1) is normally occupied by the Junior Engineering Officer. Similarly, the position of Circus Leader (Red 9) is occupied by a technician of sergeant rank; the other slots being filled by technicians holding corporal or senior aircraftman rank, with a photographer in the "Circus 10" position and, typically, the Senior Engineering Officer as "Circus 11", when the Officer Commanding flies. Each member of the Circus works with the same pilot for the duration of the season and is responsible for servicing and refuelling their aircraft and preparing their flying kit prior to each display. Circus members fly in the back seats of the jets during transit flight to ensure ground support at any location where the team lands. Two specialist engineering "Dye" Teams also support the Red Arrows when moving around the UK, or overseas, deploying with a 'smoke rig' to strategic locations in order to replenish the smoke pod.

== Aircraft ==
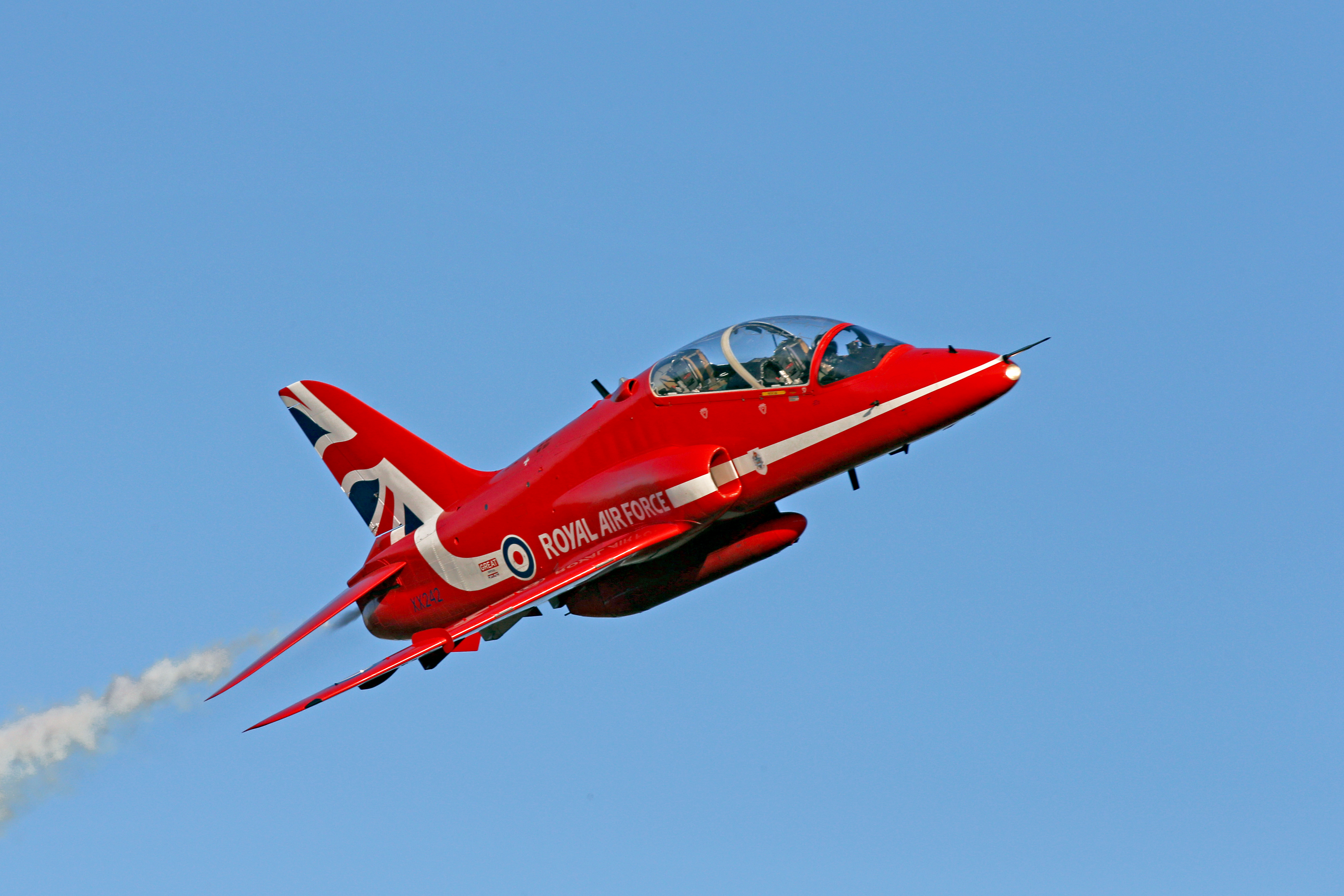
A Hawk T1A of the Red Arrows with new 2015 colour scheme

The team use the same two-seat training aircraft used for advanced pilot training, at first the Folland Gnat which was replaced in 1979 by the BAE Systems Hawk T1.

The Hawks in 1979 were assembled at RAF Bitteswell in Leicestershire; the site had 1,100 workers. The first of the ten Hawks was delivered on Friday 17 August 1979, with the ninth 'XX266' being delivered on 15 November 1979.

The full set of Hawks would be shown to the public at Bitteswell on 18 November 1979, which was moved to 15 November 1978. The Hawk had less acceleration than the Gnat.

British Aerospace (Hawker Siddeley before 1977) at Bitteswell had been the engineering 'home' of the unit since the era of the Gnats in 1968. The winter overhaul would be at Bitteswell, from 1968. After a Gnat had left Bitteswell, it would have another 1,000 hours of flying life. The aircraft would be totally stripped of red paint, and repainted red only once flight tests were acceptable. Team pilots would visit Bitteswell.

The Gnat Orpheus engine was built by Rolls-Royce at Ansty, and serviced there, with components made in Coventry. The Hawk Adour engine was built in Derby.

Hawks would be sent for repair to Bitteswell.155 Hawks were being delivered to the RAF, with 20 more after November 1979. 1980 was the first Hawk season. Margaret Thatcher visited the site on 27 June 1980, sitting in a Hawk jet. In late March 1982 it was announced that the 567-acre Bitteswell site would close in 1983, due to widespread defence cuts, one week before the Falklands war. It had been a repair site since 1956. It is now a huge distribution centre.

The Hawks are modified with an uprated engine and a modification to enable smoke to be generated; diesel is mixed with a coloured dye and ejected into the jet exhaust to produce either red, white or blue smoke.

The Hawk T1 is expected to remain in service until the end of the 2029 display season and is set to be replaced by the new "British Jet Trainer System" as part of the 2026 Defence Investment Plan.

== Displays ==
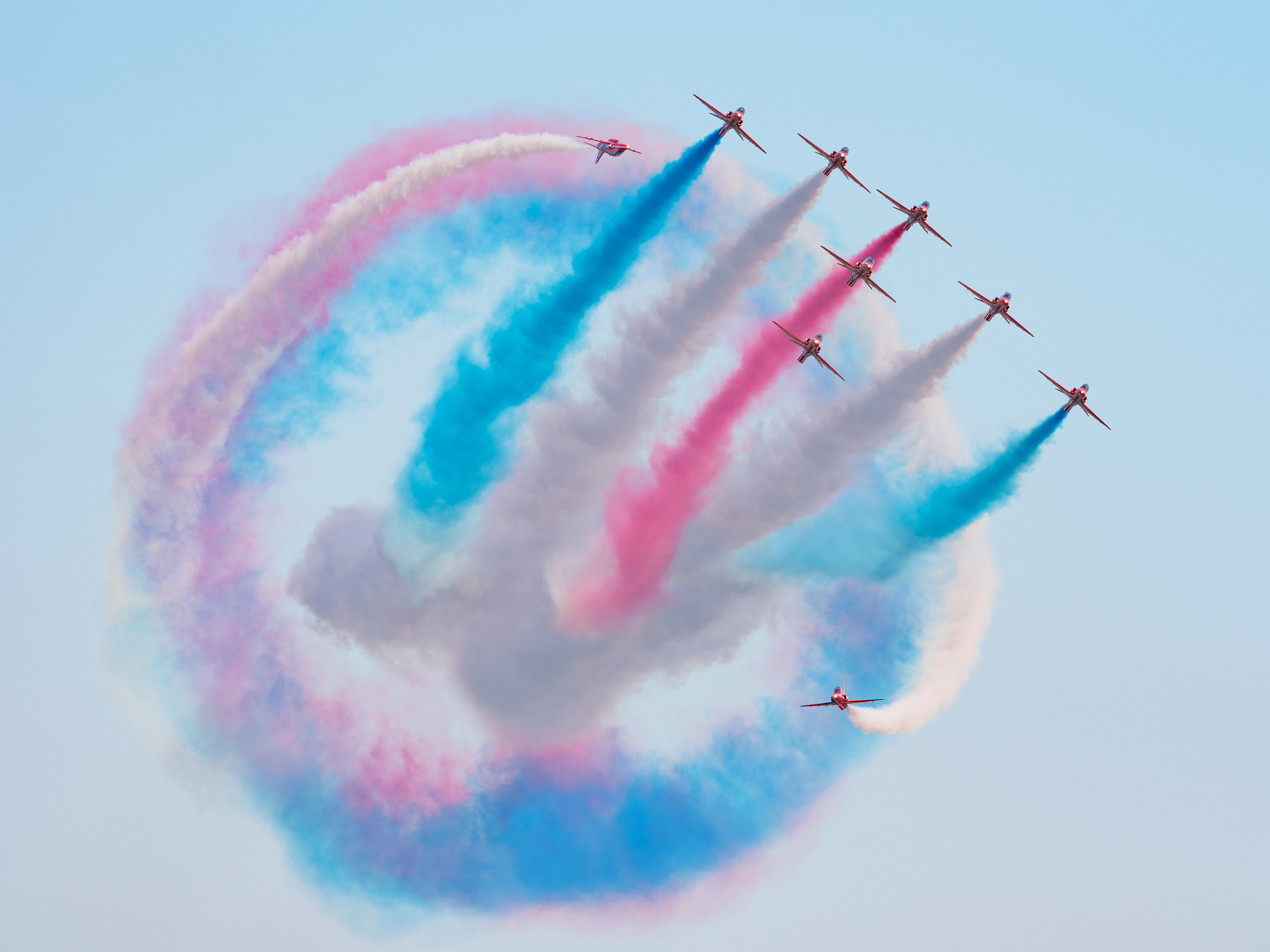
The Red Arrows flying their famous "Tornado" manoeuvre.

The first display by the Red Arrows was at RAF Little Rissington on 6 May 1965. The display was to introduce the Royal Air Force Aerobatic Team to the media. However, the first public display was on 9 May 1965 in France, at the French National Air Day in Clermont-Ferrand. The first public display in the UK was on 15 May 1965 at the Biggin Hill International Air Fair. The first display with nine aircraft was on 8 July 1966 at RAF Little Rissington.

The first display in Germany was at RAF Laarbruch on 6 August 1965. The Red Arrows performed in Germany a further 170 times before formation aerobatics were banned in Germany following the Ramstein airshow disaster in 1988.

Red Arrows flypast RIAT 18 July 2025

Red Arrows whiz over the Douglas R4D Sky Train at RIAT 18 July 2025

During displays, the aircraft do not fly directly over the crowd apart from entering the display area by flying over the crowd from behind; any manoeuvres in front of and parallel to the audience can be as low as 300 feet (91 m), the 'synchro pair' can go as low as 100 feet (30 m) straight and level, or 150 feet (46 m) when in inverted flight. To carry out a full looping display the cloud base must be above 5,500 feet (1,700 m) to avoid the team entering the cloud while looping. If the cloud base is less than 5,500-foot (1,700 m) but more than 2,500-foot (760 m) the Team will perform the Rolling Display, substituting wing-overs and rolls for the loops. If the cloud base is less than 2,500-foot (760 m) the Team will fly the Flat Display, which consists of a series of fly-pasts and steep turns.

The greatest number of displays flown in any year was in 1995, when the Red Arrows performed 136 times. The smallest number of displays in one year was in 1975, after the 1973 oil crisis limited their appearances. At a charity auction in 2008, a British woman paid £1.5 million to fly with them.

By the end of the 2009 season, the Red Arrows had performed a total of 4,269 displays in 53 countries. The 4,000th display was at RAF Leuchars during the Battle of Britain Airshow in September 2006.

Following the accidents during the 2011 season, the Red Arrows retained Red 8 and moved the original Red 10 to the Red 5 position to enable them to continue displaying with nine aircraft. In March 2012, the MoD announced that the Red Arrows would fly aerobatic displays with seven aircraft during the 2012 display season as Flt Lt Kirsty Stewart had moved into a ground-based role with the team. It is believed this was due to the emotional stress she had been suffering over the loss of her two Red Arrows colleagues the previous year. As a consequence of this, Red 8 also dropped out of the display team to enable an odd number of aircraft to perform and thus maintain formation symmetry. The team carried out official flypasts with nine aircraft by using Red 8 as well as ex-Red Arrow display pilot and then Red 10 Mike Ling. The Red Arrows returned to a full aerobatic formation of nine aircraft in 2013.

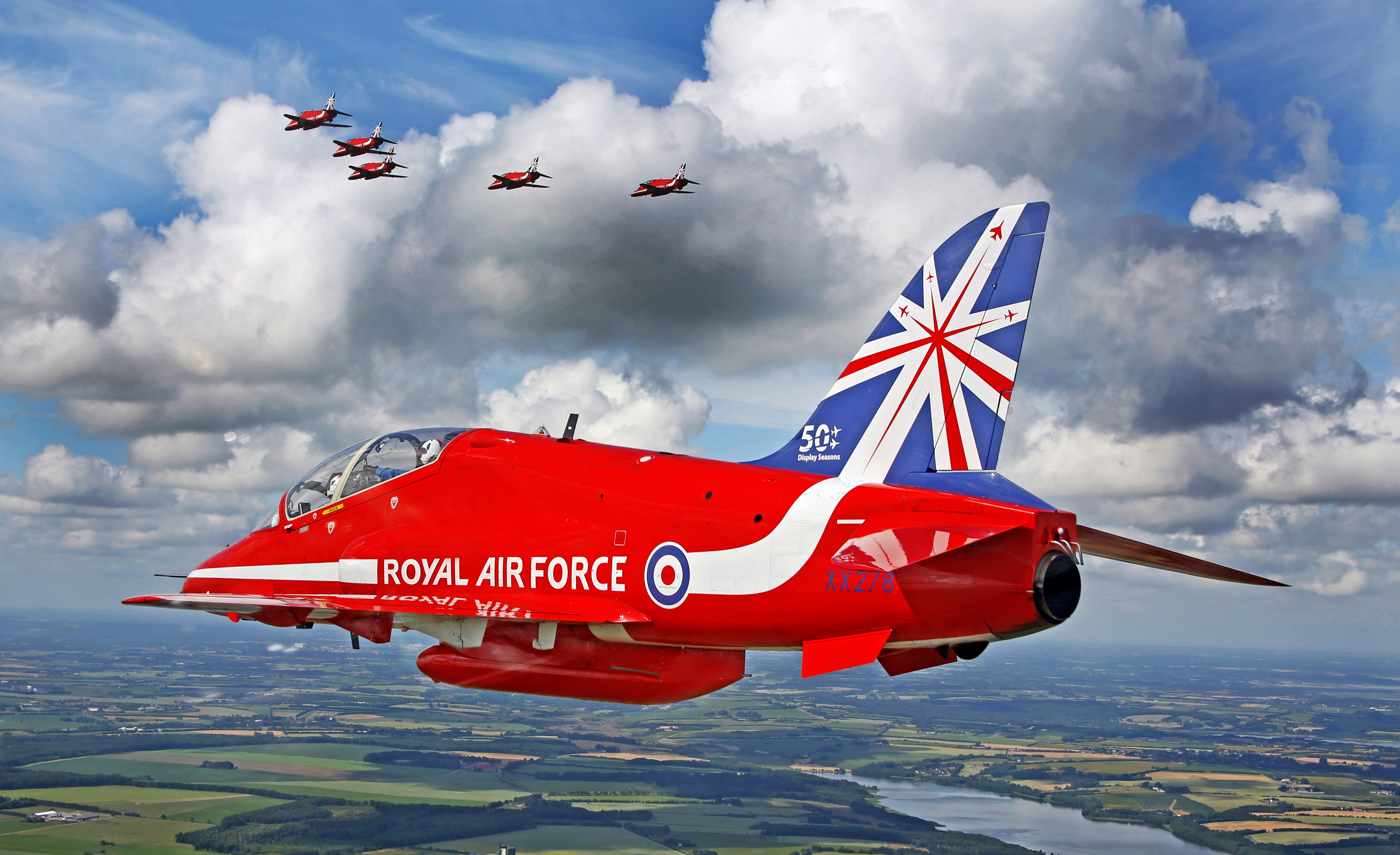
Red 6 with the 50th anniversary tail markings

In 2014, The Red Arrows celebrated 50 years of Aerobatic history as a display team returning to RAF Fairford for the Royal International Air Tattoo (RIAT). For the entirety of the 2014 display season, the aircraft carried special 50th Anniversary markings on their tails instead of just the red, white and blue stripes.

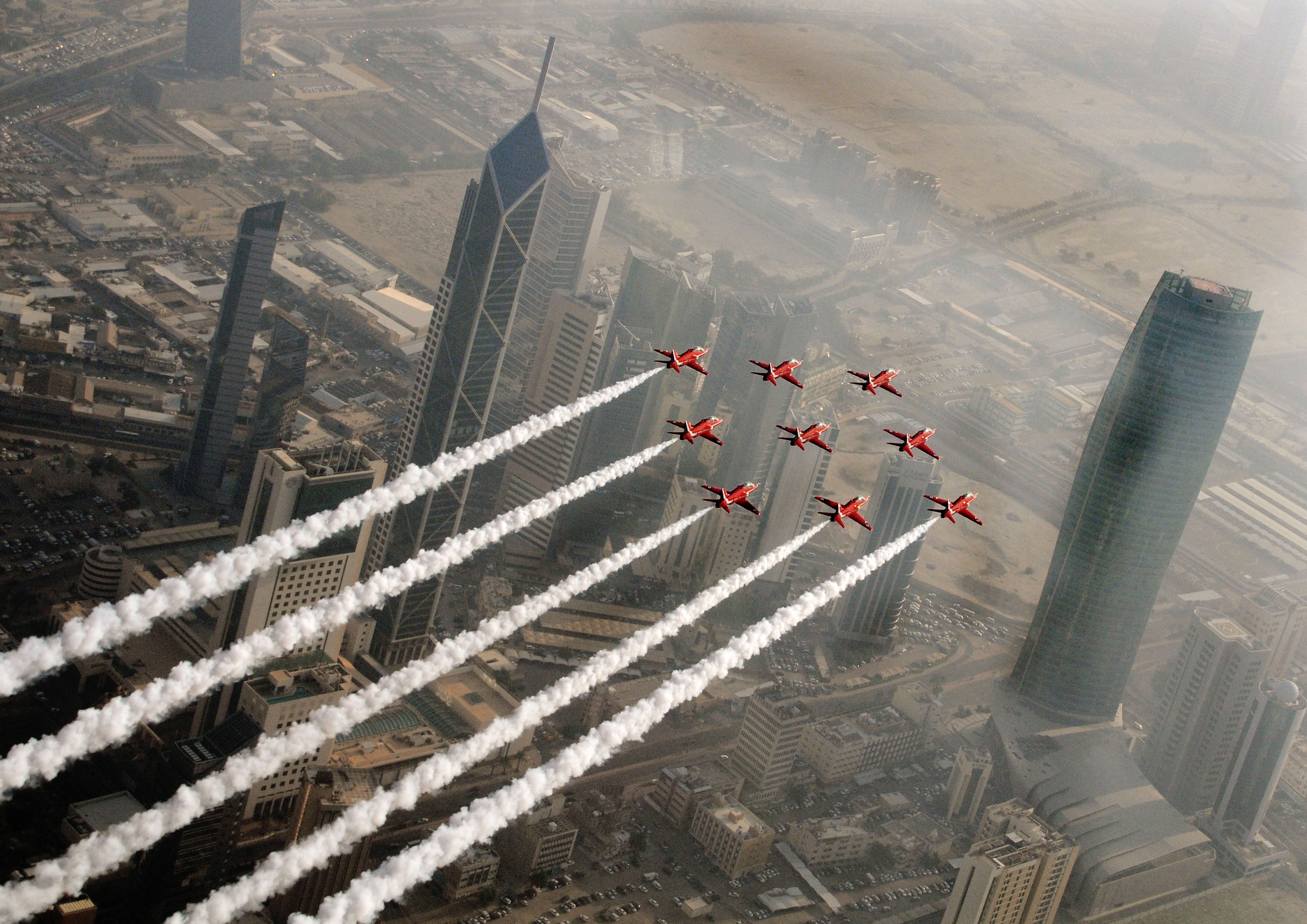
The Red Arrows over Kuwait City

After the 2016 display season, the Red Arrows embarked on an Asia-Pacific and Middle East Tour. They performed flypasts or displays in Karachi in Pakistan; Hindon and Hyderabad in India; Dhaka in Bangladesh; Singapore; Kuala Lumpur in Malaysia; Danang in Vietnam; Beijing, Shanghai, Wuhan, Guangzhou, Hong Kong and Zhuhai in China; Muscat in Oman; Manama in Bahrain; Abu Dhabi and Kuwait. The programme was the first time the team had displayed in China, and the first time a British military aircraft had deployed to Vietnam.

The summer 2019 display season took the team on a tour of North America, known as Western Hawk 19. After performing at RIAT, the team departed across the Atlantic at the end of July. As well as performing at US and Canadian air shows, they promoted the UK through school visits and meetings with business leaders. This was the Red Arrows' biggest-ever tour, flying to more than 25 cities, 21 displays and 30 flypasts.

For the 2022 display season, The Red Arrows are flying a seven aircraft display, due to "2 formation pilots moving to other roles within the RAF". Flypasts are still intended to be performed with nine aircraft, with experienced Red Arrows pilots flying the remaining 2 aircraft. On 2 June 2022 Trooping the Colour, as part of Platinum Jubilee of Elizabeth II, closed with the Queen and Royal Family observing a flypast from the balcony of Buckingham Palace.

=== Display charges ===
In 1977, a charge of £200 was introduced by the MoD for a Red Arrows display. By 2000, the charge had risen to £2,000 (including VAT and insurance). In 2011 the team manager quoted the charge as £9,000.

=== Transits ===
On a transit flight (getting to or from a display location) the team may fly at the relatively low altitude of 1,000 feet (300 m). This avoids the complication of moving through the cloud base in formation, and also avoids much controlled air space. Jets are more efficient at higher altitude, so longer flights are made at 35,000 to 42,000 feet (11,000 to 13,000 m). On transit flights, the formation can include spare planes. Sometimes a C-130 Hercules or an Atlas C.1 accompanies them, carrying spare parts. They often provide flypasts and brief displays to smaller events if they are already passing over or it is a small detour.

As the fuel capacity of the Hawk sets a limit to nonstop flight distance, and the Hawk is incapable of air-to-air refuelling, very long flights between display sites may need landings on the way to refuel. For example, a flight from RAF Scampton to Quebec for an international air display team competition had to be done in seven hops: RAF Scampton, RAF Kinloss (Scotland), Keflavík (Iceland), Kangerlussuaq (west Greenland), Narsarsuaq (south tip of Greenland), Goose Bay (Newfoundland) and Bagotville (Quebec).

For the same reason, Red Arrows displays in New Zealand are unlikely because there is no land near enough for a Hawk to land and refuel to reach New Zealand on the most fuel that it can carry.

=== Smoke ===
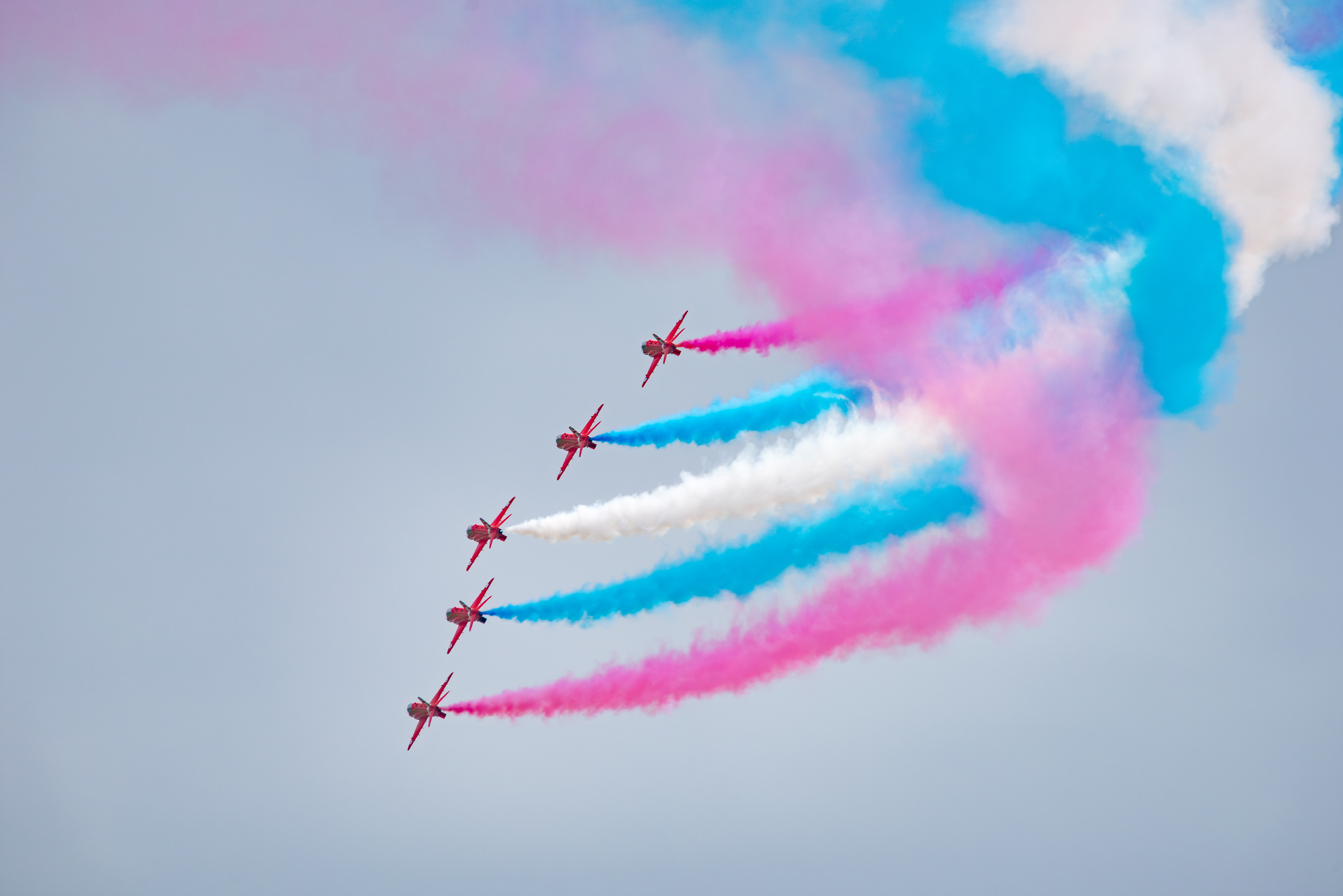
Red Arrows with red, white and blue smoke at the Royal International Air Tattoo in 2023.

The smoke trails left by the team are made by releasing diesel into the exhaust; this vaporises in the hot exhaust flow, then re-condenses into very fine droplets that give the appearance of a white smoke trail. Dyes can be added to produce the red and blue colour. The diesel is stored in the pod on the underside of the plane; it houses three tanks: one 50-imperial-gallon (230 L) tank of pure diesel and two 10-imperial-gallon (45 L) tanks of blue and red dyed diesel. The smoke system uses 10 imperial gallons (45 L) per minute; therefore each plane can trail smoke for a total of seven minutes: five minutes of white smoke, a minute of blue, and a minute of red.

In 2021, the MoD asked the civil sector to help develop an environmentally friendly smoke system for the team's aircraft. This is part of its drive to make the RAF net-zero by 2040.

== XX306 at Coneygarth Services ==
XX306 was one of the Red Arrows original Hawk t1 jets and was the last aircraft to leave RAF Scampton before the bases closure in 2023. XX306 is now on display at Coneygarth Services just off the A1 at Leeming Bar

== Incidents and accidents ==
Data from: Ejection History – Red Arrows

26 March 1969
Gnat XR573 hit trees while joining formation during a practice at RAF Kemble. Flt Lt Jerry Bowler did not activate the ejection seat and was killed.
15 June 1969
Three aircraft hit a flock of birds in a display at RAF Wildenrath
16 December 1969
Two Gnats crashed, XR995 at Kemble, on fire and XR992 in a field near Chelworth. The pilots both ejected safely although a fire warning from air traffic was intended for XR995.
20 January 1971
Gnats XR986 and XR545, collided during the cross-over manoeuvre over the runway at Kemble, with four fatalities.
26 April 1971
Over Kent, two aircraft touched and had to make an emergency landing
13 December 1971
Gnat XR567 crashed on approach to RAF Upper Heyford. Flt Lt Clem Longdon and Flt Lt Richard "Dick" Michael Storr did not eject and were killed.
16 February 1976
Gnat XP531 struck a cable and made emergency landing at RAF Kemble; damaged beyond repair. Both crew ejected safely.
June 1976
Gnat XR987 – Flight instrument technician in the rear seat ejected during check flight to investigate uncommanded control movements. Pilot Flt Lt Dudley Carvell – Cpl Ginger Whelan ejected through the canopy from the back seat when he thought control of aircraft had been lost. "No-one was hurt and we had the aircraft flying again the next week"
24 June 1976
Gnat Red 1 XS111 – The undercarriage collapsed when the aircraft ran into the overrun area after the brakes failed on landing at RAF Kemble, Gloucestershire; Sqn Ldr Richard "Dickie" Duckett was unhurt.
3 March 1978
Gnat Red 4 XR981 – Struck ground whilst practising Vic rollback aerobatics at RAF Kemble. Pilot Flt Lt Stephen Edward Noble and Wg. Cdr. Dennis George Hazell AFC died; XR981 happened during pre-season practice, specifically while the team were practicing roll-backs at low altitude. The aircraft ended up inverted and neither occupant left the aircraft. One seat fired, but couldn't go anywhere. Steve Noble survived initially but died later that day.
22 May 1979
Gnat XP539 had a fuel blockage that caused engine problems and aircraft was abandoned at RAF Leeming, Yorkshire. Wg Cdr Ernie Jones ejected OK (XP539 actually belonged to the Red Arrows, but was a reserve ship not fitted with smoke. It was flown by Wg Cdr Ernie Jones, who was the only person on board, and was visiting Training Command HQ. The accident was due to asymmetric fuelling of the aircraft – when one side ran out of fuel the flow proportioner, which equalised usage from both sides, cut the fuel flow off from the other side, causing embarrassment).
17 May 1980
Hawk XX262 hit a yacht mast at an air show in Brighton, Sussex. The pilot, Sqn Ldr Steve Johnson, ejected safely.
21 March 1984
A Hawk hit the ground at RAF Akrotiri, Cyprus, while practising a loop. The pilot, Flt Lt Chris Hirst, suffered serious injuries when the impact with the ground forced the ejection seat through the canopy and deployed the drogue chute, dragging him out.
31 August 1984
Hawk XX257 crashed into the sea 3 miles off Sidmouth, Devon after the engine suffered a failure of a rotor blade in the low pressure compressor. Pilot, Flt Lt P.D. Lees was rescued by a Sidmouth independent inshore rescue boat.
1986
A Hawk rammed into the back of another on a runway.
3 November 1986
Hawk XX297 flown by Flt Lt Dan Findlay flew into the jet wash of the leading aircraft during a practice display at RAF Scampton and was unable to relight the Hawk's engine. The pilot ejected safely after unsuccessfully attempting an emergency landing back at RAF Scampton.
16 November 1987
Hawks XX241 & XX259 collided during a winter training practice with one aircraft crashing into a house in the village of Welton, Lincolnshire. The aircraft of Flt Lt Spike Newbery struck the aircraft of new Team Leader Sqn Ldr Tim Miller from behind, knocking off the tail. Both pilots ejected successfully. Flt Lt Newbery suffered a broken leg and had to leave the team.
24 June 1988
Hawk XX304 crashed whilst attempting to take off, and the fuel tanks exploded. The pilot Sqn Ldr Pete J. Collins, Red Arrows' deputy leader, ejected safely.
22 January 1988
Hawk XX243 crashed practising a "roll back" at RAF Scampton. The pilot Flt Lt Neil Duncan MacLachlan was killed.
17 October 1998
Flt Lt R. Edwards landed short of the runway after a practice run at the Red Arrows then home base, RAF Cranwell, and ejected safely at low altitude.
9 September 2003
A Hawk overshot the runway while landing at Jersey Airport in advance of an air display. The pilot Flt Lt Jez Griggs ran the jet into a gravel pile and little damage was sustained.
12 January 2007
The wingtip of a Hawk hit the tail of another during a practice flight near RAF Scampton.
23 March 2010
Two Hawks were involved in a mid-air collision. The synchro pair were practising one of their manoeuvres when the two aircraft collided. Red 7 (Flt Lt David Montenegro) landed his plane safely, but Red 6 (Flt Lt Mike Ling) ejected and suffered a dislocated shoulder. The incident took place during pre-season training in Crete. Due to his injuries, Flt Lt Ling was unable to participate in the forthcoming display season and was replaced by 2008's Red 6, Flt Lt Paul O'Grady.
20 August 2011

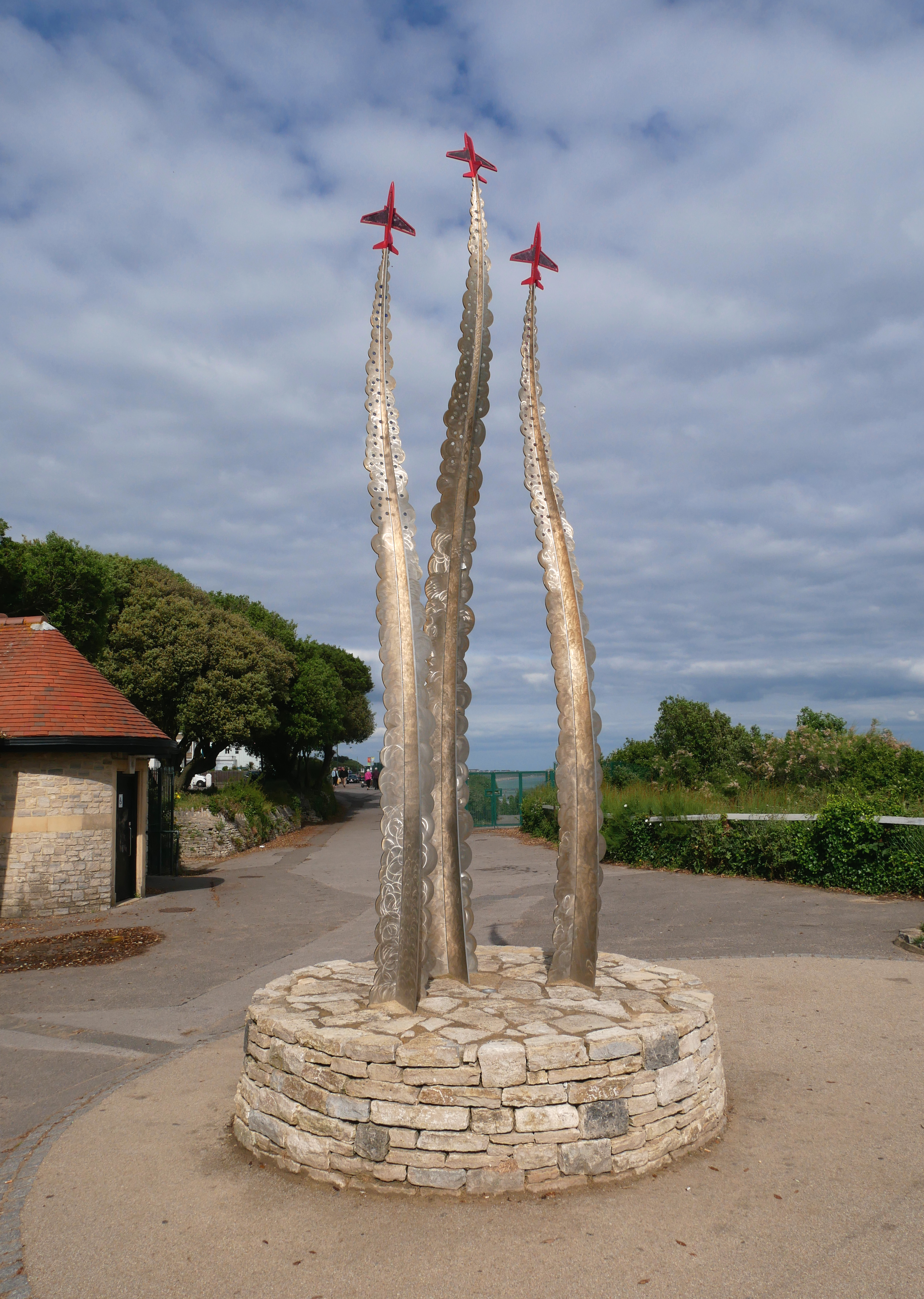
Memorial to Flt Lt Jon Egging at East Cliff, Bournemouth

A Hawk aircraft crashed into a field near Throop Mill, one mile from Bournemouth Airport following a display at the Bournemouth Air Festival. Flt Lt Jon Egging, pilot of Red 4 (XX179), died in the accident. The investigation into the incident determined that Flt Lt Egging was incapacitated due to the effects of g-force induced loss of consciousness until very shortly before impact. A memorial to Egging was originally unveiled in 2012 at East Cliff, Bournemouth, before being moved to a new location nearby in 2017 following a landslip. His widow Emma Egging was made an OBE in the 2021 Birthday Honours.
8 November 2011
Pilot Flt Lt Sean Cunningham was ejected from his aircraft while it was on the ground at RAF Scampton and subsequently died from his injuries. He was shot 220 feet (67 m) into the air and received fatal injuries when his parachute failed to open. The UK Health and Safety Executive announced in 2016 that it would be prosecuting the ejection seat manufacturer Martin-Baker for breach of Health and Safety law. The company has since pleaded guilty to breaching section 3(1) of the Health and Safety at Work etc. Act 1974.
20 March 2018
A Hawk crashed at RAF Valley. Two people, the pilot and an engineer, were on board at the time. The pilot of Red 3, Flt Lt David Stark, was hospitalised with non-life-threatening injuries whilst the engineer, Cpl Jonathan Bayliss, was killed. According to the coroner the crash could have been avoided. Flt Lt Stark was unable to resume his place in the 2018 display team and was replaced by Sqn Ldr Mike Ling, outgoing Red 10.
28 August 2022
A bird strike smashed the cockpit canopy of Red 6 during the closing display at Rhyl Air Show. As a result the display was cut short and the Red Arrows returned to Hawarden airfield where they were based for the weekend. The pilot, Sqn Ldr Gregor Ogston was unharmed. Images shared on The Red Arrows social media accounts showed his helmet had taken the impact force of the bird strike.

== Video game ==
In 1985, Database Software released a flight simulator called Red Arrows, made in cooperation with the flight team. In the simulator, stunts have to be performed while flying in formation. It was available for the ZX Spectrum, Commodore 64, Amstrad CPC, Acorn Electron, BBC Micro and Atari.

== Former pilots ==
- Sqn Ldr Jeff Glover, from 1988; he was shot down in May 1982 in Harrier XZ972 of 1 Sqn, by a Blowpipe missile, and taken prisoner in the Falklands; he was the only British pilot to be captured by the Argentinians, and held for seven weeks, with 12 days in a darkened room; he originated from Eccleston in Merseyside, attending the Cowley Grammar School, joined Oxford University Air Squadron, studying engineering, and played for the university football team, playing at Wembley in December 1972; he broke his collar bone and left shoulder in the ejection in 1982; he joined the unit, aged 33, in January 1988, to replace 32 year old Flt Lt Neil MacLachlan, who was killed.
