= Officer Commanding of the Red Arrows =

Officer Commanding of Royal Air Force Aerobatic Team
- Incumbent; Sasha Nash since January 2026
- Abbreviation: OC RAFAT

The Officer Commanding of the Red Arrows is the most senior officer of the Royal Air Force Aerobatic Team, the aerobatics display team of the Royal Air Force (RAF) commonly known as the Red Arrows.

== Officers Commanding ==
Name	Photograph	Term	Ref.
Ben Murphy		2010 – ?	
Neil Fraser		? – ?	
Andrew Keith		September 2017 – April 2020	
David Montenegro		April 2020 – January 2023	
Adam Collins		January 2023 – January 2026	
Sasha Nash		January 2026 – Incumbent	
