= Red Pelicans =

RAF display team 1958–1973

- Red Pelicans team badge
- Active: 1958–1973
- Country: United Kingdom
- Branch: Royal Air Force
- Role: Aerobatic flight display team
- Base: RAF Little Rissington
- Colours: Red

Aircraft flown
- Trainer: Hunting Percival Jet Provost T.4

The Red Pelicans were one of a number of aerobatics display teams of the Royal Air Force before the Red Arrows were selected to represent the service in 1965. The Red Pelicans flew the BAC Jet Provost aircraft.

== History ==
In 1958, the Central Flying School based at RAF Little Rissington formed a four-ship aerobatics display team of Hunting Percival Jet Provost T.1s, known simply as The Sparrows. The team had previously flown with the Percival Provost. The following year this team was renamed The Redskins.

In 1960, the aircraft were replaced with the Jet Provost T.3 and the team renamed The Pelicans after the mascot of the Central Flying School. The team's aircraft had no special markings applied, but wore the standard silver and orange day-glow training colours of the day.

Halfway through the 1962 season, the team re-equipped with four Jet Provost T.4s and a smoke system was also fitted to each of the display aircraft and thus the Red Pelicans team was born, and they performed at shows up and down the country, including the annual SBAC show Farnborough in September 1962.

The 1963 season saw the team extended to six aircraft. The aircraft were also given a new colour scheme, with the standard training colours replaced by overall day-glow red.

At the end of the display season the RAF decided that the Red Pelicans should be the premier Royal Air Force aerobatic team for the 1964 air show season, led by Flt. Lt. T.E.L. Lloyd. The Pelicans replaced the No. 56 Squadron RAF "Firebirds" English Electric Lightning team in the role.

In 1965, the Red Arrows took over the role of the RAF's aerobatic team and the Red Pelicans were trimmed down to four aircraft without a smoke system facility. They were also re-painted into a post-box-red scheme.

The Red Pelicans continued to entertain the crowds at air shows, often alongside the Red Arrows, until they were forced to disband at the end of the 1973 season by the 1973 oil crisis.
