= Sasha Nash =

British pilot

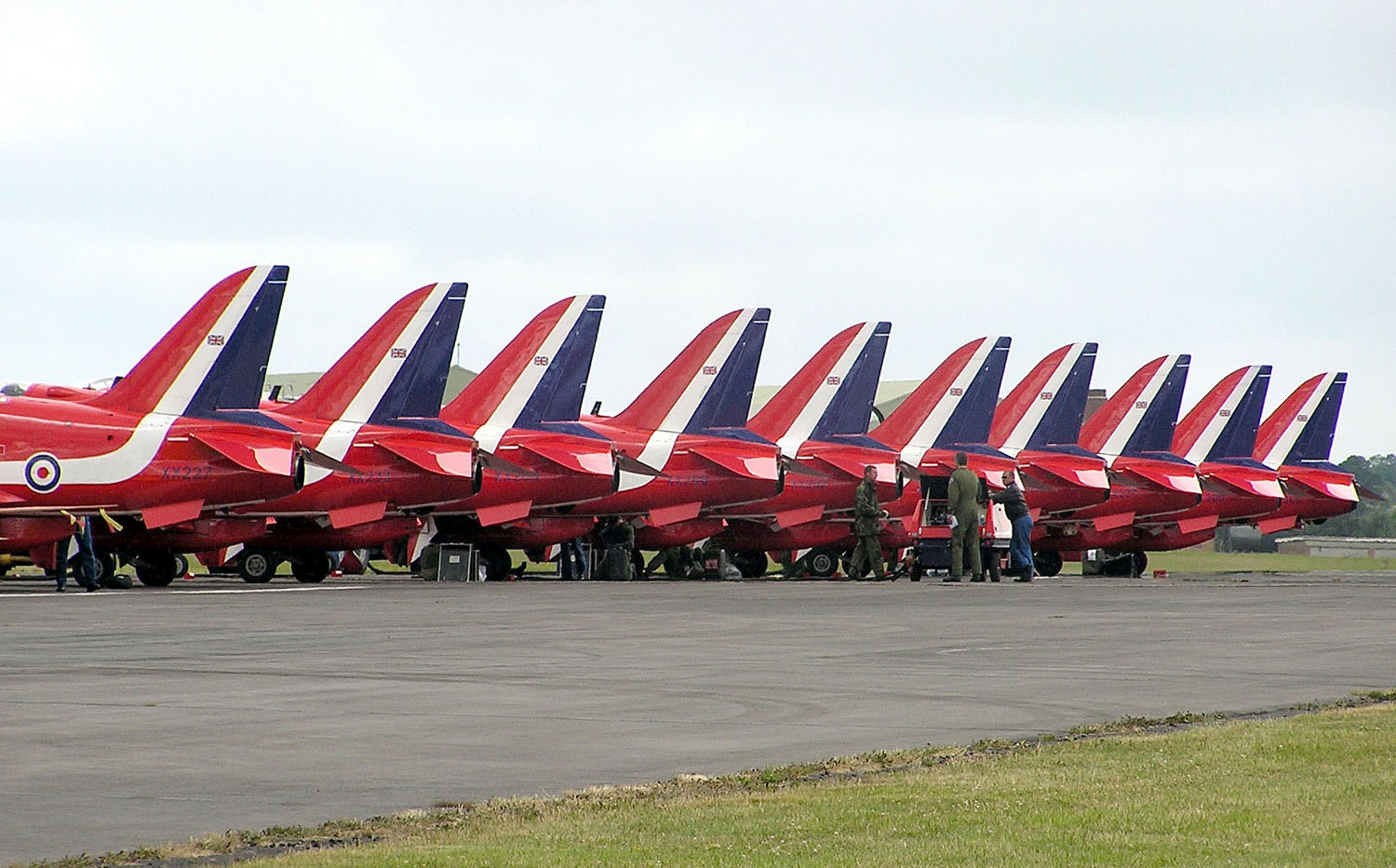
- All ten planes
- Born: Berkshire
- Education: Lady Eleanor Holles School, University of Leicester
- Occupation: Wing commander
- Known for: head of the Red Arrows
- Predecessor: Andrew Collins

Wing Commander Sasha Nash is a British pilot who leads the Royal Air Force aerobatic display team (known as the Red Arrows) from 2026.

== Early life and education ==
Nash was born in Berkshire, England and by the age of six she developed an ambition to be a jet pilot. She attended Lady Eleanor Holles School. The RAF gave her a scholarship during her sixth form studies and supported her to study psychology at the University of Leicester. In 2005 she joined the RAF.

== Career ==
She completed an initial training course as an officer in 2006 and was selected for training as a pilot of fast jets. She learned to fly both BAE Systems Hawk T1 and Embraer EMB 312 Tucanos. She then attended an Operational Conversion Unit where she learned to pilot the RAF's Panavia Tornado GR4. She was then based in Norfolk at RAF Marham where 31 Squadron operates. She flew the Tornadoes in several countries including a tour in Afghanistan.

In 2026 she succeeded Wing Commander Adam Collins as the commander of the Red Arrows. He had overseen the squadron after accusations of the harassment of women within the RAF which he announced has finished in 2024. Nash was the first woman to hold this position. As the commander of the Royal Air Force Aerobatic Team she leads 150 people at RAF Waddington.

In addition to her work with the RAF, Nash has played senior lacrosse for England.
