= RAF Little Rissington =

Former Royal Air Force base in Gloucestershire, England

RAF Little Rissington
- Near Upper Rissington, Gloucestershire in England
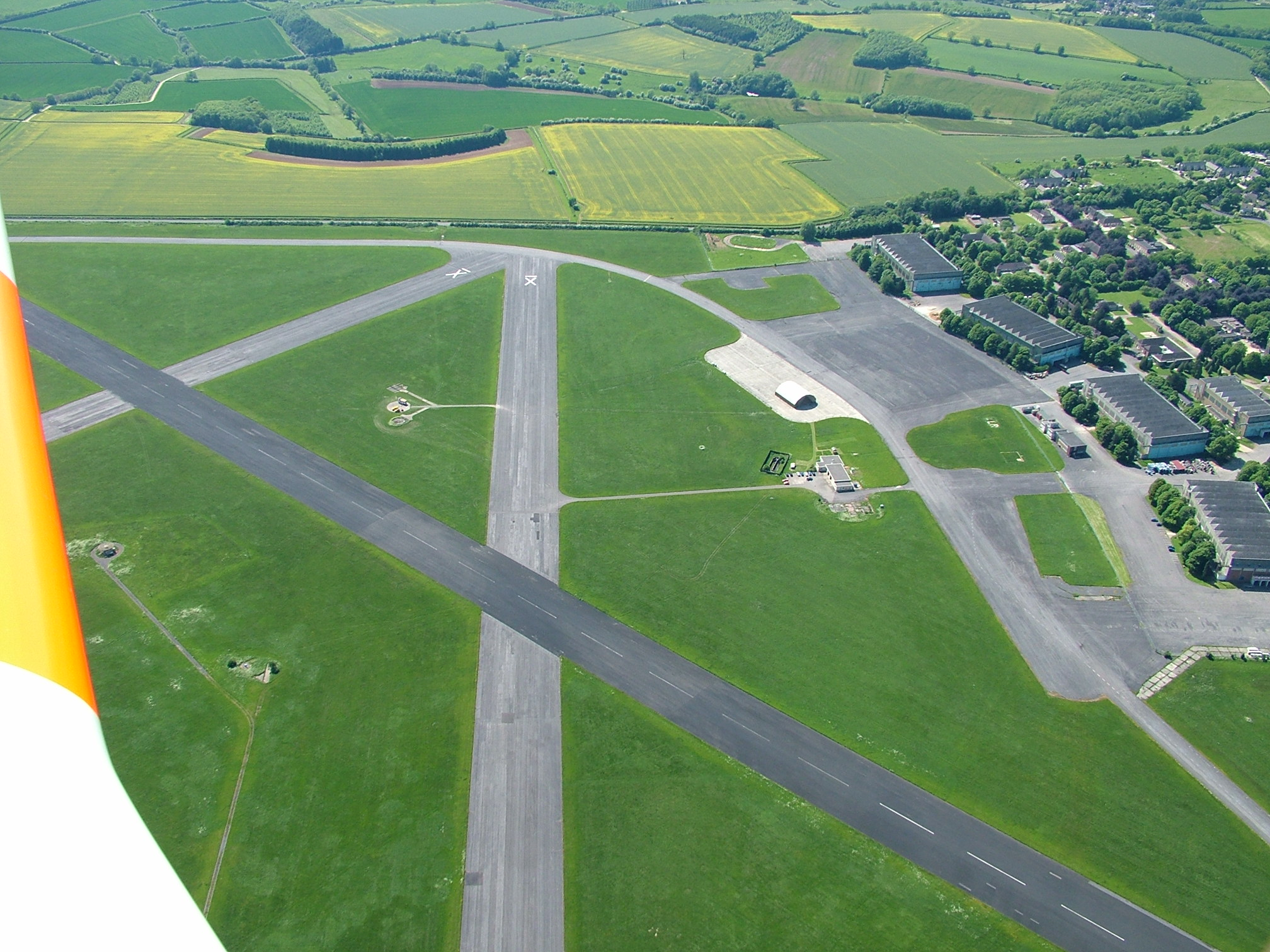
- Little Rissington airfield during 2006.

Site information
- Type: Royal Air Force satellite flying station
- Code: LR
- Owner: Ministry of Defence
- Operator: Royal Air Force
- Controlled by: No. 22 Group (Training)
- Condition: Active

Location
- Shown within Gloucestershire RAF Little Rissington (the United Kingdom)
- Coordinates: 51°52′N 001°42′W

Site history
- Built: 1937/38
- In use: 1938–1976 (RAF), 1981-1993 (USAFE), 1993-Present (RAF)
- Fate: Retained in military use by the RAF following USAFE withdrawal in 1993, as a site for gliding, as a parachute drop-zone and periodic training by ground units and aircraft.

Garrison information
- Occupants: No. 612 Volunteer Gliding Squadron

Airfield information
- Identifiers: ICAO: EGVL
- Elevation: 223 metres (732 ft) AMSL
Runways
Direction	Length and surface
04/22	1,494 metres (4,902 ft) Asphalt
09/27	1,085 metres (3,560 ft) Asphalt
13/31	985 metres (3,232 ft) Asphalt

Royal Air Force Little Rissington or more simply RAF Little Rissington (ICAO: EGVL) is a Royal Air Force satellite station in Gloucestershire, England. It was once home to the Central Flying School, the Vintage Pair and the Red Arrows.

Built during the 1930s, the station was opened in 1938 and closed in 1994. The married-quarters and main technical site were sold in 1996 (the former becoming the village of Upper Rissington). RAF Little Rissington has been retained by the Ministry of Defence and is known as Little Rissington Airfield. It remains active along with the southern technical sites, under the operational control of HQ No. 2 Flying Training School RAF at RAF Syerston. It is now home to 612 Volunteer Gliding Squadron RAF as the primary military unit, providing elementary flying training for Combined Cadet Force and Air Training Corps cadets. The airfield is also used by the forces as a relief landing ground, training area and parachute dropping area.

In March 2015, construction began on a new hangar.

In 2017, investment was made in upgrading facilities for the RAF Air Cadets. The old fire station was upgraded to provide modern teaching facilities and an accommodation block with a canteen was built next door. The new hangar is now operational for the storage and maintenance of the gliders. The airfield has had major groundworks on the grassed area creating a grassed runway.

== History ==
=== The beginning: 1930s into war ===
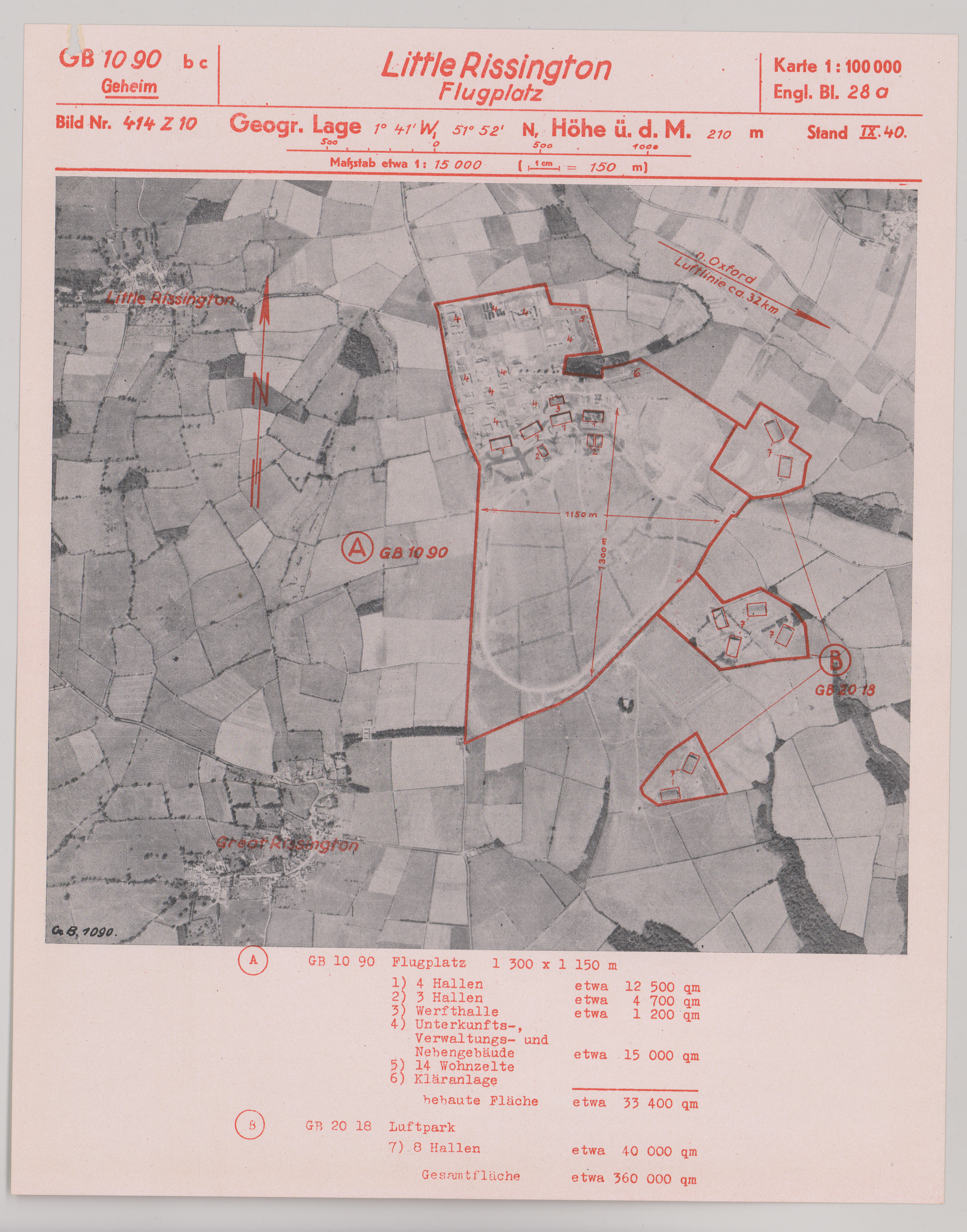
RAF Little Rissington on a target dossier of the German Luftwaffe, 1940

During the build-up to the Second World War, the Air Ministry began constructing major airfields across the United Kingdom under what was known as the Expansion Period. RAF Little Rissington was one of these airfields.

RAF Little Rissington officially opened in 1938, comprising the domestic site and a grass airfield. During 1942, three asphalt runways were laid. Extra land was added to accommodate Sites A to E. Later in the war, the main runway 05/23 was extended northerly (later to become the main runway for instrument landings), 09/27 and 14/32 were extended easterly and south-easterly respectively.

Up to 1945 the station accommodated No. 6 Service Flying Training School RAF and No. 8 Maintenance Unit RAF. No. 8 Maintenance Unit was originally designated No. 8 Aircraft Storage Unit (ASU), however as the Second World War increased its momentum, so did the number of aircraft being stored. During the mid-1940s dispersal areas began openly storing aircraft, that had arrived straight from the manufacture. Due to security concerns, the level of security protection stepped up during the war, including the Station's own fighter force of several Supermarine Spitfires. Later in the war, various satellite airfields were used to spread out the increased number of aircraft.

=== Central Flying School: 1946 to 1976 ===
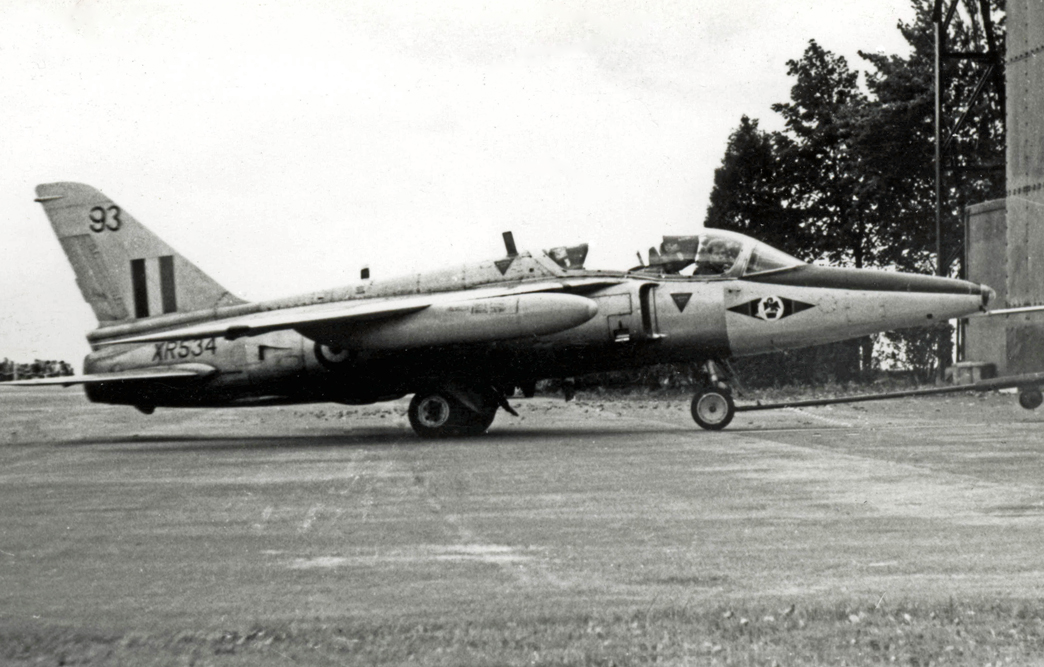
Folland Gnat advanced trainer of the RAF Central Flying School at Little Rissington in 1967

In 1946 the Royal Air Force Central Flying School (CFS) moved to Little Rissington. The airfield also became the home to the RAF's aerobatics teams which included the Red Pelicans and later the Red Arrows. The airfield was expanded during this period, and a new fire station and control tower were built. The airfield closed on 23 April 1976.

The Little Rissington UFO incident took place in October 1952.

=== Imjin Barracks: 1977 to 1979 ===
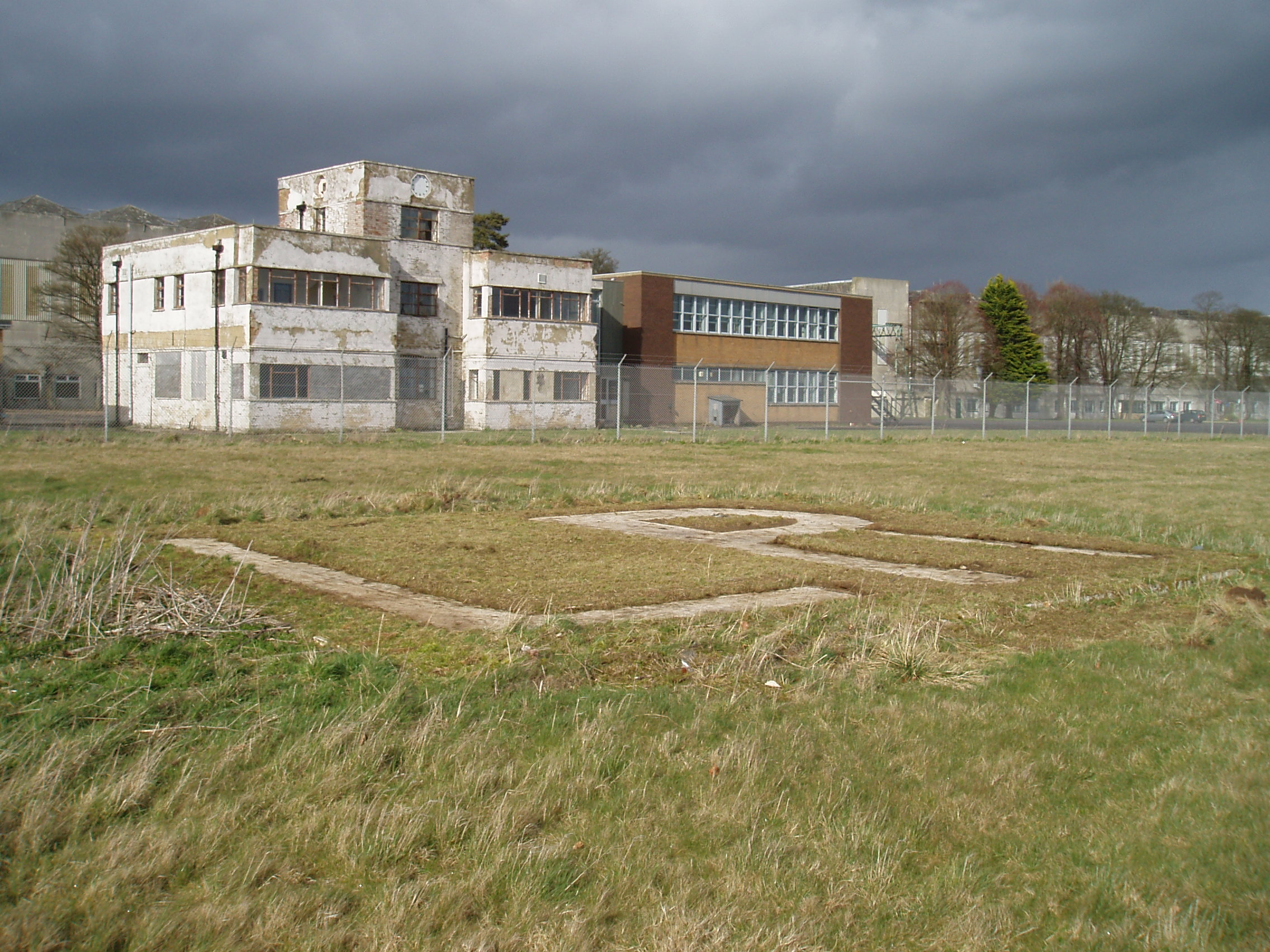
CFS Watch Tower behind the Aerodrome Identifier

After CFS's departure, the airfield was used by the Army, and with the arrival of the Royal Irish Rangers, Little Rissington became "Imjin Barracks".

=== USAFE at RAF Little Rissington: 1981 to 1994 ===
With the arrival of the United States Air Forces in Europe, Little Rissington became the largest military contingency hospital in Europe. The aerodrome was cleared for Lockheed C-130 Hercules and Lockheed C-5 Galaxies. During the Gulf War, Little Rissington was held on its highest readiness state for several decades as it prepared for casualties. The USAF left Little Rissington in 1994 and it was handed back to the Royal Air Force.

=== The draw down: 1994 to 2005 ===
Little Rissington was identified as surplus to requirements in the Government's "Options for Change" package and the entire site was put up for sale. The domestic and main technical sites of the station were sold to a property developer and became a business park.

=== Revival: 2006 to 2010 ===
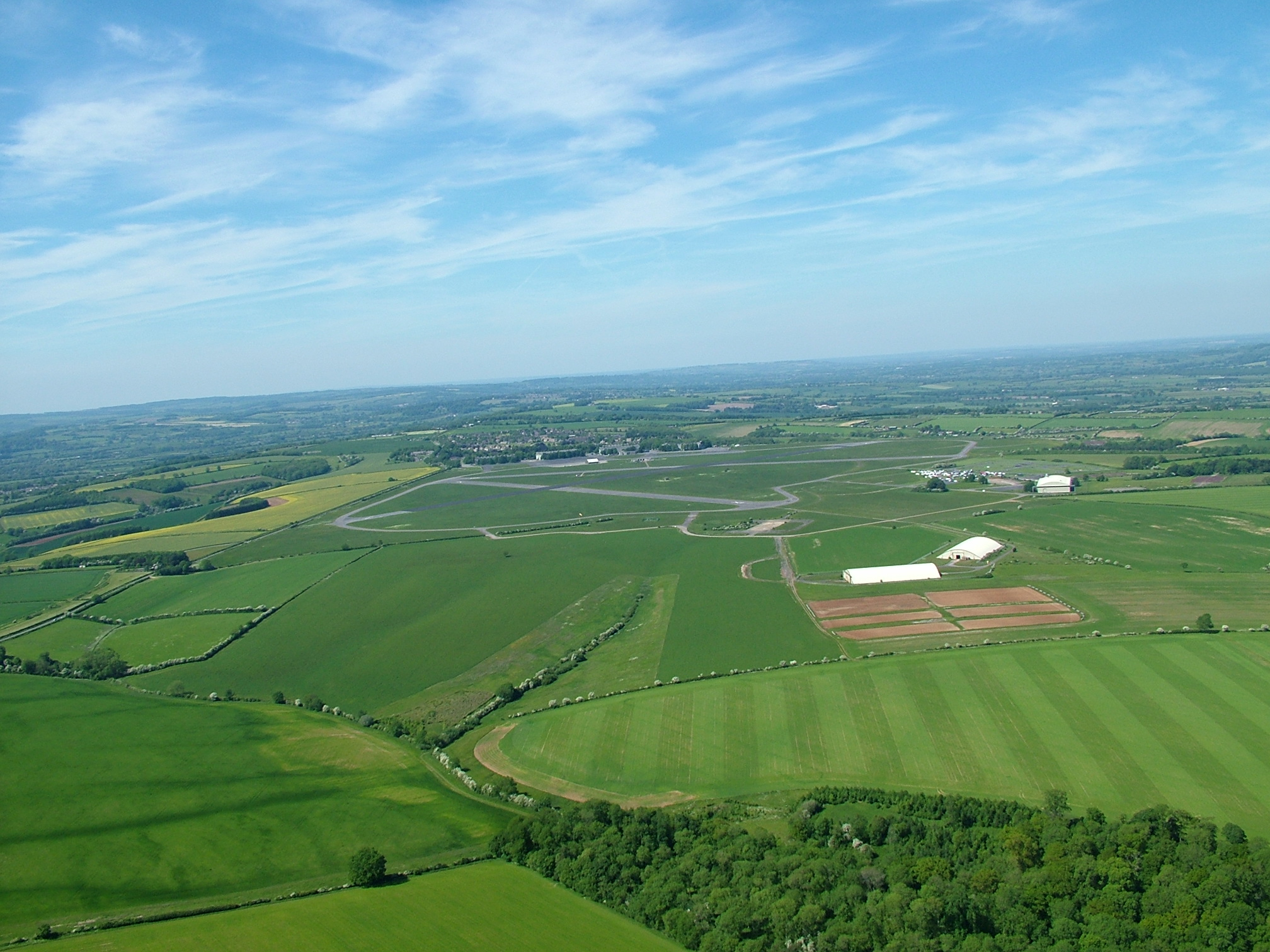
RAF Little Rissington Aerodrome 2006

Following a Defence Review, the planned disposal of RAF Little Rissington was stopped, and so the immediate future of the aerodrome was secured. Several buildings received some minor upgrades. At the end of 2006, a civilian aircraft maintenance firm called 'Devonair' moved in under an agreement with the Ministry of Defence until 2012.

In 2008, RAF Little Rissington was designated a Core Site up to 2030, under the Defence Estates Development Plan 2008. While nothing has yet been confirmed, RAF Little Rissington has been looked at to support various changes:

- Satellite for RAF Brize Norton in supporting the Future Brize Project (formerly Project CATARA) with C130 Hercules training and maintenance.
- Satellite for RAF Benson, to provide a relief landing ground for helicopter training, and potentially relief storage pending the future decision on the Lyneham estate.

In 2011 the airfield was identified as a site with "localised radium contaminated soil" from the scrapping of surplus equipment after the Second World War. At the end of 2011, the Upper Rissington Business Park owner Reland commenced the demolition of the main technical site. This demolition forms part of their future plans are to turn the technical site and former married quarters into an eco-town. During 2014 to 2015, the four prominent Type-C Hangars were demolished and major housing construction carried out.

=== Present ===
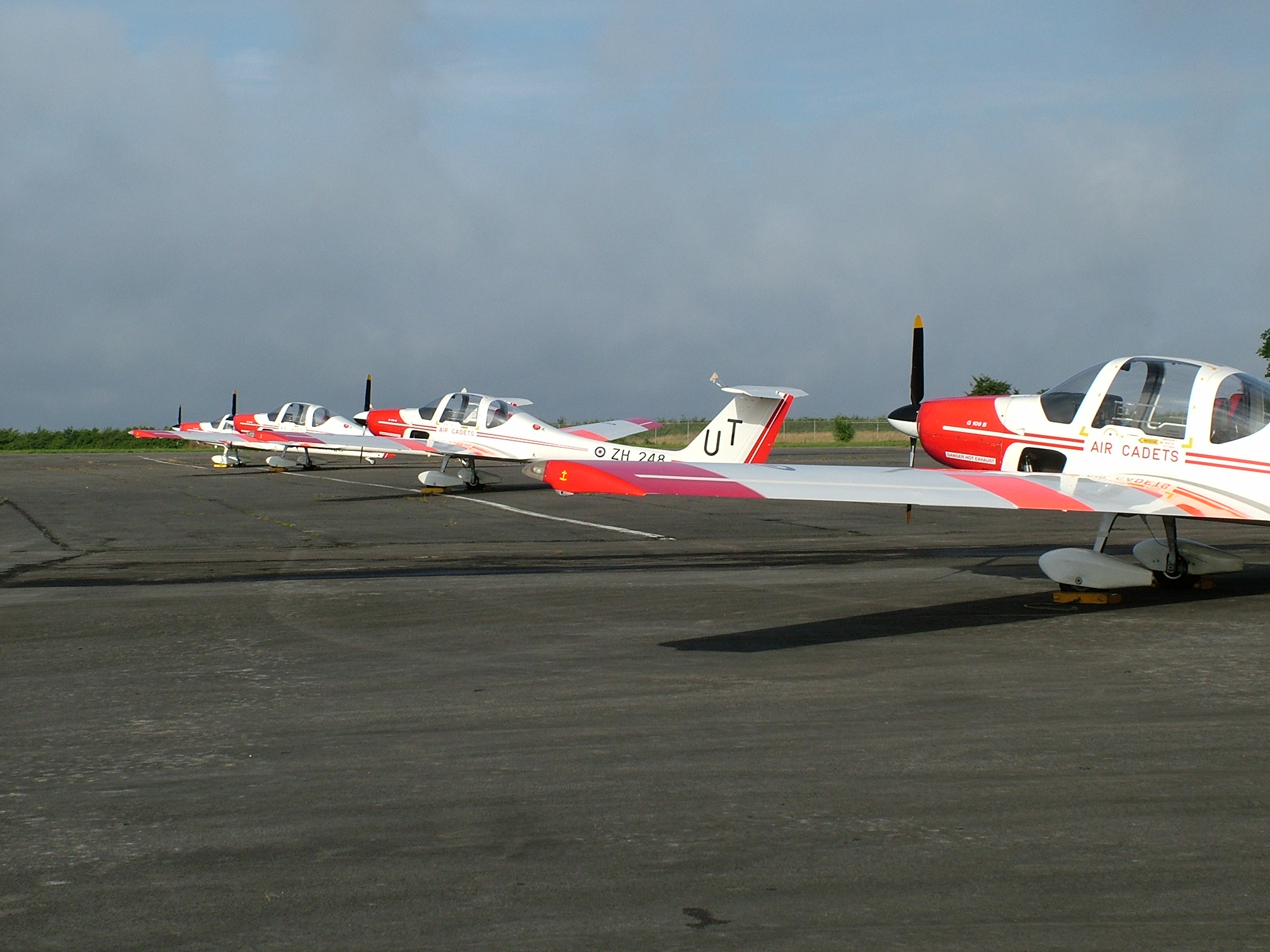
637VGS Fleet 2006

In 2014, real estate development commenced on the airfield by the Royal Air Force to facilitate a centralised flying training strategy by No. 2 Flying Training School. This included a conversion of the fire station into an Operations Centre and the building of a new hangar / maintenance facility on the main dispersal. Planning permission was approved by the Cotswold District Council in July 2015 for the construction of an Aircrew Mess where the former control tower was originally located. In 2016, the RAF Ceremonial approved a station badge as no formal badge ever existed for RAF Little Rissington. This badge adopted the 22 (Training) Group badge and motto.

The airfield, RAF Little Rissington, remains active and is regularly used for elementary flying training, air drops, aircraft maintenance, and ground training.

== Historic monuments ==
RAF Little Rissington is one of several MoD estates with a scheduled monument. It is a Neolithic long barrow dating from between 3400 and 2400 BC on the eastern side of the airfield. It is 157 feet (48 m) long, up to 92 feet (28 m) wide and up to 6 feet (1.8 m) high. It had a stone-lined passage about 66 feet (20 m) long, starting at its northeast end and ending in a small burial chamber. The barrow was partly excavated in 1934. During the Second World War the Air Ministry built a large air-raid shelter into it to protect the service personnel working in the maintenance units. Under the MoD's obligation to preserve and protect the UK's ancient monuments on their estates, this particular monument has in recent years been subject to several inspections by Defence Estates.

== Units ==
=== Maintenance units ===
- No. 8 Aircraft Storage Unit (1938–1946), renamed No. 8 Maintenance Unit RAF

=== Flying training units ===
- No. 6 Service Flying Training School RAF (1938–1942), renamed No. 6 (Pilots) Advanced Flying Unit RAF (1942-?)
- No. 23 Blind Approach Training Flight RAF (1941–1942), renamed No. 1523 (Beam Approach Training) Flight RAF (1942–1945)
- Royal Air Force Central Flying School (1946–1976)
- No. 637 Volunteer Gliding School (1976–2005), renamed No. 637 Volunteer Gliding Squadron RAF (2005 – August 2024)
- No. 621 Volunteer Gliding Squadron RAF (2016 – August 2024), previously based at RAF Hullavington
- No. 612 Volunteer Gliding Squadron (September 2024 - Present)

=== Aerobatics display units ===
- The Meteorites (1952-53)
- The Pelicans (1956, 1960 & 1961)
- The Sparrows (1957)
- The CFS Jet Aerobatic Team (1958)
- The Redskins (1959)
- Pelican Red (1960)
- The Red Pelicans (1962–1973)
- CFS JP Aerobatic Team (1965)
- The Red Arrows (1965–1976)
- The Skylarks (1966-1970)
- The Vintage Pair (1972-76)

=== Army units ===
- Royal Irish Rangers (1977–1978)

=== Overseas units ===
- United States Air Force - European Force (1981–1993)
- 20th Tactical Fighter Wing - (Lodging)

== Station Commanders ==
- 1938 Group Captain A. Ellis
- 1940 Group Captain C.E. Barraclough
- 1943 Group Captain M.H. Kelly
- 1945 Group Captain E.P. McKay
- 1946 Group Captain E.A.C Britton
- 1946 Group Captain W.L.M. MacDonald
- 1948 Group Captain G.D.S Stephenson
- 1950 Group Captain G.T. Jarman

== In popular culture ==
In previous years, the Royal Air Force estate has been used as a film set, including The Avengers, part of the ice chase in Die Another Day, and the Thunderbirds film.

== See also ==
- List of former Royal Air Force stations
- United States Air Force in the United Kingdom
